

67001–67100 

|-bgcolor=#E9E9E9
| 67001 ||  || — || December 5, 1999 || Catalina || CSS || PAD || align=right | 4.9 km || 
|-id=002 bgcolor=#E9E9E9
| 67002 ||  || — || December 5, 1999 || Catalina || CSS || — || align=right | 7.1 km || 
|-id=003 bgcolor=#E9E9E9
| 67003 ||  || — || December 5, 1999 || Catalina || CSS || GEF || align=right | 5.4 km || 
|-id=004 bgcolor=#d6d6d6
| 67004 ||  || — || December 5, 1999 || Catalina || CSS || SAN || align=right | 3.3 km || 
|-id=005 bgcolor=#E9E9E9
| 67005 ||  || — || December 5, 1999 || Catalina || CSS || — || align=right | 4.9 km || 
|-id=006 bgcolor=#E9E9E9
| 67006 ||  || — || December 5, 1999 || Catalina || CSS || GEF || align=right | 3.4 km || 
|-id=007 bgcolor=#E9E9E9
| 67007 ||  || — || December 5, 1999 || Catalina || CSS || — || align=right | 4.0 km || 
|-id=008 bgcolor=#E9E9E9
| 67008 ||  || — || December 7, 1999 || Catalina || CSS || — || align=right | 5.3 km || 
|-id=009 bgcolor=#E9E9E9
| 67009 ||  || — || December 7, 1999 || Catalina || CSS || — || align=right | 4.0 km || 
|-id=010 bgcolor=#E9E9E9
| 67010 ||  || — || December 7, 1999 || Catalina || CSS || — || align=right | 4.1 km || 
|-id=011 bgcolor=#E9E9E9
| 67011 ||  || — || December 7, 1999 || Catalina || CSS || — || align=right | 3.4 km || 
|-id=012 bgcolor=#E9E9E9
| 67012 ||  || — || December 7, 1999 || Catalina || CSS || GEF || align=right | 4.2 km || 
|-id=013 bgcolor=#E9E9E9
| 67013 ||  || — || December 7, 1999 || Catalina || CSS || — || align=right | 5.7 km || 
|-id=014 bgcolor=#d6d6d6
| 67014 ||  || — || December 7, 1999 || Catalina || CSS || EOS || align=right | 5.1 km || 
|-id=015 bgcolor=#E9E9E9
| 67015 ||  || — || December 7, 1999 || Catalina || CSS || — || align=right | 6.4 km || 
|-id=016 bgcolor=#E9E9E9
| 67016 ||  || — || December 12, 1999 || Socorro || LINEAR || — || align=right | 4.2 km || 
|-id=017 bgcolor=#d6d6d6
| 67017 ||  || — || December 12, 1999 || Socorro || LINEAR || — || align=right | 7.5 km || 
|-id=018 bgcolor=#d6d6d6
| 67018 ||  || — || December 12, 1999 || Socorro || LINEAR || — || align=right | 9.9 km || 
|-id=019 bgcolor=#fefefe
| 67019 Hlohovec ||  ||  || December 13, 1999 || Modra || L. Kornoš, J. Tóth || V || align=right | 1.6 km || 
|-id=020 bgcolor=#d6d6d6
| 67020 ||  || — || December 11, 1999 || Uccle || T. Pauwels || SYL7:4 || align=right | 12 km || 
|-id=021 bgcolor=#E9E9E9
| 67021 ||  || — || December 15, 1999 || Fountain Hills || C. W. Juels || — || align=right | 3.4 km || 
|-id=022 bgcolor=#d6d6d6
| 67022 ||  || — || December 7, 1999 || Kitt Peak || Spacewatch || KOR || align=right | 3.0 km || 
|-id=023 bgcolor=#E9E9E9
| 67023 ||  || — || December 13, 1999 || Anderson Mesa || LONEOS || EUN || align=right | 3.3 km || 
|-id=024 bgcolor=#d6d6d6
| 67024 ||  || — || December 7, 1999 || Socorro || LINEAR || — || align=right | 9.8 km || 
|-id=025 bgcolor=#d6d6d6
| 67025 ||  || — || December 8, 1999 || Socorro || LINEAR || — || align=right | 4.1 km || 
|-id=026 bgcolor=#d6d6d6
| 67026 ||  || — || December 8, 1999 || Socorro || LINEAR || — || align=right | 13 km || 
|-id=027 bgcolor=#E9E9E9
| 67027 ||  || — || December 8, 1999 || Socorro || LINEAR || — || align=right | 4.6 km || 
|-id=028 bgcolor=#E9E9E9
| 67028 ||  || — || December 8, 1999 || Socorro || LINEAR || — || align=right | 5.2 km || 
|-id=029 bgcolor=#E9E9E9
| 67029 ||  || — || December 10, 1999 || Socorro || LINEAR || ADE || align=right | 9.8 km || 
|-id=030 bgcolor=#d6d6d6
| 67030 ||  || — || December 10, 1999 || Socorro || LINEAR || 627 || align=right | 8.8 km || 
|-id=031 bgcolor=#E9E9E9
| 67031 ||  || — || December 10, 1999 || Socorro || LINEAR || — || align=right | 3.9 km || 
|-id=032 bgcolor=#d6d6d6
| 67032 ||  || — || December 10, 1999 || Socorro || LINEAR || EOS || align=right | 5.2 km || 
|-id=033 bgcolor=#E9E9E9
| 67033 ||  || — || December 10, 1999 || Socorro || LINEAR || — || align=right | 7.6 km || 
|-id=034 bgcolor=#d6d6d6
| 67034 ||  || — || December 10, 1999 || Socorro || LINEAR || EOS || align=right | 6.7 km || 
|-id=035 bgcolor=#E9E9E9
| 67035 ||  || — || December 10, 1999 || Socorro || LINEAR || — || align=right | 4.0 km || 
|-id=036 bgcolor=#d6d6d6
| 67036 ||  || — || December 10, 1999 || Socorro || LINEAR || 628 || align=right | 6.8 km || 
|-id=037 bgcolor=#d6d6d6
| 67037 ||  || — || December 12, 1999 || Socorro || LINEAR || — || align=right | 13 km || 
|-id=038 bgcolor=#E9E9E9
| 67038 ||  || — || December 12, 1999 || Socorro || LINEAR || — || align=right | 4.9 km || 
|-id=039 bgcolor=#d6d6d6
| 67039 ||  || — || December 12, 1999 || Socorro || LINEAR || EOS || align=right | 6.7 km || 
|-id=040 bgcolor=#E9E9E9
| 67040 ||  || — || December 12, 1999 || Socorro || LINEAR || — || align=right | 2.8 km || 
|-id=041 bgcolor=#d6d6d6
| 67041 ||  || — || December 12, 1999 || Socorro || LINEAR || — || align=right | 8.2 km || 
|-id=042 bgcolor=#d6d6d6
| 67042 ||  || — || December 12, 1999 || Socorro || LINEAR || EOS || align=right | 5.0 km || 
|-id=043 bgcolor=#d6d6d6
| 67043 ||  || — || December 12, 1999 || Socorro || LINEAR || — || align=right | 7.2 km || 
|-id=044 bgcolor=#E9E9E9
| 67044 ||  || — || December 12, 1999 || Socorro || LINEAR || — || align=right | 4.3 km || 
|-id=045 bgcolor=#d6d6d6
| 67045 ||  || — || December 12, 1999 || Socorro || LINEAR || — || align=right | 6.4 km || 
|-id=046 bgcolor=#d6d6d6
| 67046 ||  || — || December 12, 1999 || Socorro || LINEAR || — || align=right | 8.9 km || 
|-id=047 bgcolor=#d6d6d6
| 67047 ||  || — || December 12, 1999 || Socorro || LINEAR || EOS || align=right | 5.9 km || 
|-id=048 bgcolor=#d6d6d6
| 67048 ||  || — || December 12, 1999 || Socorro || LINEAR || — || align=right | 9.0 km || 
|-id=049 bgcolor=#E9E9E9
| 67049 ||  || — || December 12, 1999 || Socorro || LINEAR || — || align=right | 4.0 km || 
|-id=050 bgcolor=#d6d6d6
| 67050 ||  || — || December 12, 1999 || Socorro || LINEAR || URS || align=right | 7.0 km || 
|-id=051 bgcolor=#d6d6d6
| 67051 ||  || — || December 12, 1999 || Socorro || LINEAR || EOS || align=right | 5.2 km || 
|-id=052 bgcolor=#E9E9E9
| 67052 ||  || — || December 13, 1999 || Socorro || LINEAR || — || align=right | 6.6 km || 
|-id=053 bgcolor=#E9E9E9
| 67053 ||  || — || December 13, 1999 || Socorro || LINEAR || MAR || align=right | 2.9 km || 
|-id=054 bgcolor=#d6d6d6
| 67054 ||  || — || December 13, 1999 || Socorro || LINEAR || TIR || align=right | 6.9 km || 
|-id=055 bgcolor=#E9E9E9
| 67055 ||  || — || December 13, 1999 || Socorro || LINEAR || — || align=right | 9.9 km || 
|-id=056 bgcolor=#E9E9E9
| 67056 ||  || — || December 14, 1999 || Socorro || LINEAR || — || align=right | 3.2 km || 
|-id=057 bgcolor=#E9E9E9
| 67057 ||  || — || December 7, 1999 || Catalina || CSS || GEF || align=right | 3.5 km || 
|-id=058 bgcolor=#E9E9E9
| 67058 ||  || — || December 7, 1999 || Catalina || CSS || — || align=right | 5.8 km || 
|-id=059 bgcolor=#E9E9E9
| 67059 ||  || — || December 7, 1999 || Anderson Mesa || LONEOS || EUN || align=right | 6.8 km || 
|-id=060 bgcolor=#E9E9E9
| 67060 ||  || — || December 7, 1999 || Anderson Mesa || LONEOS || — || align=right | 3.9 km || 
|-id=061 bgcolor=#E9E9E9
| 67061 ||  || — || December 3, 1999 || Socorro || LINEAR || — || align=right | 4.3 km || 
|-id=062 bgcolor=#d6d6d6
| 67062 ||  || — || December 4, 1999 || Anderson Mesa || LONEOS || EOS || align=right | 6.2 km || 
|-id=063 bgcolor=#E9E9E9
| 67063 ||  || — || December 4, 1999 || Catalina || CSS || AGN || align=right | 3.1 km || 
|-id=064 bgcolor=#d6d6d6
| 67064 ||  || — || December 7, 1999 || Catalina || CSS || — || align=right | 7.6 km || 
|-id=065 bgcolor=#C2FFFF
| 67065 ||  || — || December 3, 1999 || Socorro || LINEAR || L4 || align=right | 22 km || 
|-id=066 bgcolor=#fefefe
| 67066 || 1999 YO || — || December 16, 1999 || Socorro || LINEAR || H || align=right | 1.4 km || 
|-id=067 bgcolor=#E9E9E9
| 67067 ||  || — || December 30, 1999 || Socorro || LINEAR || BRU || align=right | 8.2 km || 
|-id=068 bgcolor=#d6d6d6
| 67068 ||  || — || December 27, 1999 || Kitt Peak || Spacewatch || — || align=right | 7.3 km || 
|-id=069 bgcolor=#E9E9E9
| 67069 ||  || — || January 2, 2000 || Kleť || Kleť Obs. || ADE || align=right | 9.3 km || 
|-id=070 bgcolor=#d6d6d6
| 67070 Rinaldi ||  ||  || January 1, 2000 || San Marcello || L. Tesi, A. Boattini || — || align=right | 4.7 km || 
|-id=071 bgcolor=#d6d6d6
| 67071 ||  || — || January 2, 2000 || Socorro || LINEAR || ALA || align=right | 8.9 km || 
|-id=072 bgcolor=#E9E9E9
| 67072 ||  || — || January 3, 2000 || Socorro || LINEAR || EUN || align=right | 3.8 km || 
|-id=073 bgcolor=#fefefe
| 67073 ||  || — || January 3, 2000 || Socorro || LINEAR || NYS || align=right | 1.9 km || 
|-id=074 bgcolor=#d6d6d6
| 67074 ||  || — || January 3, 2000 || Socorro || LINEAR || — || align=right | 8.1 km || 
|-id=075 bgcolor=#d6d6d6
| 67075 ||  || — || January 3, 2000 || Socorro || LINEAR || — || align=right | 3.1 km || 
|-id=076 bgcolor=#d6d6d6
| 67076 ||  || — || January 3, 2000 || Socorro || LINEAR || — || align=right | 8.7 km || 
|-id=077 bgcolor=#E9E9E9
| 67077 ||  || — || January 3, 2000 || Socorro || LINEAR || — || align=right | 2.4 km || 
|-id=078 bgcolor=#E9E9E9
| 67078 ||  || — || January 3, 2000 || Socorro || LINEAR || DOR || align=right | 7.7 km || 
|-id=079 bgcolor=#d6d6d6
| 67079 ||  || — || January 3, 2000 || Socorro || LINEAR || ALA || align=right | 9.1 km || 
|-id=080 bgcolor=#d6d6d6
| 67080 ||  || — || January 3, 2000 || Socorro || LINEAR || EOS || align=right | 5.8 km || 
|-id=081 bgcolor=#d6d6d6
| 67081 ||  || — || January 3, 2000 || Socorro || LINEAR || HYG || align=right | 7.8 km || 
|-id=082 bgcolor=#d6d6d6
| 67082 ||  || — || January 3, 2000 || Socorro || LINEAR || — || align=right | 11 km || 
|-id=083 bgcolor=#d6d6d6
| 67083 ||  || — || January 3, 2000 || Socorro || LINEAR || — || align=right | 12 km || 
|-id=084 bgcolor=#E9E9E9
| 67084 ||  || — || January 3, 2000 || Socorro || LINEAR || — || align=right | 2.7 km || 
|-id=085 bgcolor=#fefefe
| 67085 Oppenheimer ||  ||  || January 4, 2000 || Gnosca || S. Sposetti || — || align=right | 1.2 km || 
|-id=086 bgcolor=#d6d6d6
| 67086 ||  || — || January 3, 2000 || Socorro || LINEAR || — || align=right | 8.3 km || 
|-id=087 bgcolor=#E9E9E9
| 67087 ||  || — || January 4, 2000 || Socorro || LINEAR || — || align=right | 6.5 km || 
|-id=088 bgcolor=#E9E9E9
| 67088 ||  || — || January 4, 2000 || Socorro || LINEAR || — || align=right | 4.1 km || 
|-id=089 bgcolor=#E9E9E9
| 67089 ||  || — || January 4, 2000 || Socorro || LINEAR || — || align=right | 3.2 km || 
|-id=090 bgcolor=#E9E9E9
| 67090 ||  || — || January 4, 2000 || Socorro || LINEAR || — || align=right | 5.8 km || 
|-id=091 bgcolor=#E9E9E9
| 67091 ||  || — || January 4, 2000 || Socorro || LINEAR || — || align=right | 2.6 km || 
|-id=092 bgcolor=#E9E9E9
| 67092 ||  || — || January 4, 2000 || Socorro || LINEAR || — || align=right | 2.1 km || 
|-id=093 bgcolor=#d6d6d6
| 67093 ||  || — || January 4, 2000 || Socorro || LINEAR || — || align=right | 4.4 km || 
|-id=094 bgcolor=#d6d6d6
| 67094 ||  || — || January 4, 2000 || Socorro || LINEAR || — || align=right | 7.7 km || 
|-id=095 bgcolor=#d6d6d6
| 67095 ||  || — || January 4, 2000 || Socorro || LINEAR || 7:4 || align=right | 8.7 km || 
|-id=096 bgcolor=#E9E9E9
| 67096 ||  || — || January 5, 2000 || Socorro || LINEAR || — || align=right | 3.7 km || 
|-id=097 bgcolor=#E9E9E9
| 67097 ||  || — || January 5, 2000 || Socorro || LINEAR || — || align=right | 3.3 km || 
|-id=098 bgcolor=#d6d6d6
| 67098 ||  || — || January 5, 2000 || Socorro || LINEAR || EOS || align=right | 4.2 km || 
|-id=099 bgcolor=#d6d6d6
| 67099 ||  || — || January 5, 2000 || Socorro || LINEAR || — || align=right | 9.5 km || 
|-id=100 bgcolor=#d6d6d6
| 67100 ||  || — || January 5, 2000 || Socorro || LINEAR || — || align=right | 15 km || 
|}

67101–67200 

|-bgcolor=#E9E9E9
| 67101 ||  || — || January 5, 2000 || Socorro || LINEAR || — || align=right | 3.0 km || 
|-id=102 bgcolor=#d6d6d6
| 67102 ||  || — || January 5, 2000 || Socorro || LINEAR || URS || align=right | 10 km || 
|-id=103 bgcolor=#E9E9E9
| 67103 ||  || — || January 5, 2000 || Socorro || LINEAR || — || align=right | 5.1 km || 
|-id=104 bgcolor=#d6d6d6
| 67104 ||  || — || January 5, 2000 || Socorro || LINEAR || EOS || align=right | 5.2 km || 
|-id=105 bgcolor=#d6d6d6
| 67105 ||  || — || January 5, 2000 || Socorro || LINEAR || — || align=right | 6.9 km || 
|-id=106 bgcolor=#d6d6d6
| 67106 ||  || — || January 5, 2000 || Socorro || LINEAR || — || align=right | 10 km || 
|-id=107 bgcolor=#E9E9E9
| 67107 ||  || — || January 7, 2000 || Socorro || LINEAR || — || align=right | 2.9 km || 
|-id=108 bgcolor=#E9E9E9
| 67108 ||  || — || January 5, 2000 || Socorro || LINEAR || MIT || align=right | 9.1 km || 
|-id=109 bgcolor=#E9E9E9
| 67109 ||  || — || January 5, 2000 || Socorro || LINEAR || — || align=right | 2.7 km || 
|-id=110 bgcolor=#E9E9E9
| 67110 ||  || — || January 5, 2000 || Socorro || LINEAR || — || align=right | 3.3 km || 
|-id=111 bgcolor=#E9E9E9
| 67111 ||  || — || January 5, 2000 || Socorro || LINEAR || — || align=right | 2.7 km || 
|-id=112 bgcolor=#d6d6d6
| 67112 ||  || — || January 5, 2000 || Socorro || LINEAR || — || align=right | 15 km || 
|-id=113 bgcolor=#d6d6d6
| 67113 ||  || — || January 5, 2000 || Socorro || LINEAR || — || align=right | 7.6 km || 
|-id=114 bgcolor=#d6d6d6
| 67114 ||  || — || January 5, 2000 || Socorro || LINEAR || — || align=right | 11 km || 
|-id=115 bgcolor=#d6d6d6
| 67115 ||  || — || January 5, 2000 || Socorro || LINEAR || — || align=right | 6.5 km || 
|-id=116 bgcolor=#E9E9E9
| 67116 ||  || — || January 5, 2000 || Socorro || LINEAR || — || align=right | 3.0 km || 
|-id=117 bgcolor=#E9E9E9
| 67117 ||  || — || January 5, 2000 || Socorro || LINEAR || — || align=right | 6.1 km || 
|-id=118 bgcolor=#fefefe
| 67118 ||  || — || January 5, 2000 || Socorro || LINEAR || V || align=right | 1.6 km || 
|-id=119 bgcolor=#fefefe
| 67119 ||  || — || January 5, 2000 || Socorro || LINEAR || FLO || align=right | 1.4 km || 
|-id=120 bgcolor=#d6d6d6
| 67120 ||  || — || January 5, 2000 || Socorro || LINEAR || HYG || align=right | 6.0 km || 
|-id=121 bgcolor=#d6d6d6
| 67121 ||  || — || January 5, 2000 || Socorro || LINEAR || — || align=right | 4.6 km || 
|-id=122 bgcolor=#d6d6d6
| 67122 ||  || — || January 5, 2000 || Socorro || LINEAR || — || align=right | 10 km || 
|-id=123 bgcolor=#d6d6d6
| 67123 ||  || — || January 5, 2000 || Socorro || LINEAR || EUP || align=right | 11 km || 
|-id=124 bgcolor=#E9E9E9
| 67124 ||  || — || January 5, 2000 || Socorro || LINEAR || — || align=right | 7.9 km || 
|-id=125 bgcolor=#d6d6d6
| 67125 ||  || — || January 6, 2000 || Socorro || LINEAR || THM || align=right | 5.2 km || 
|-id=126 bgcolor=#E9E9E9
| 67126 ||  || — || January 4, 2000 || Socorro || LINEAR || — || align=right | 5.7 km || 
|-id=127 bgcolor=#E9E9E9
| 67127 ||  || — || January 4, 2000 || Socorro || LINEAR || — || align=right | 5.0 km || 
|-id=128 bgcolor=#d6d6d6
| 67128 ||  || — || January 5, 2000 || Socorro || LINEAR || — || align=right | 8.5 km || 
|-id=129 bgcolor=#E9E9E9
| 67129 ||  || — || January 5, 2000 || Socorro || LINEAR || — || align=right | 2.0 km || 
|-id=130 bgcolor=#d6d6d6
| 67130 ||  || — || January 5, 2000 || Socorro || LINEAR || EOS || align=right | 7.0 km || 
|-id=131 bgcolor=#d6d6d6
| 67131 ||  || — || January 5, 2000 || Socorro || LINEAR || — || align=right | 6.3 km || 
|-id=132 bgcolor=#d6d6d6
| 67132 ||  || — || January 6, 2000 || Socorro || LINEAR || EOS || align=right | 5.4 km || 
|-id=133 bgcolor=#d6d6d6
| 67133 ||  || — || January 6, 2000 || Socorro || LINEAR || URS || align=right | 7.5 km || 
|-id=134 bgcolor=#d6d6d6
| 67134 ||  || — || January 7, 2000 || Socorro || LINEAR || URS || align=right | 14 km || 
|-id=135 bgcolor=#E9E9E9
| 67135 ||  || — || January 8, 2000 || Socorro || LINEAR || — || align=right | 3.5 km || 
|-id=136 bgcolor=#d6d6d6
| 67136 ||  || — || January 2, 2000 || Socorro || LINEAR || — || align=right | 5.4 km || 
|-id=137 bgcolor=#d6d6d6
| 67137 ||  || — || January 3, 2000 || Socorro || LINEAR || — || align=right | 8.4 km || 
|-id=138 bgcolor=#d6d6d6
| 67138 ||  || — || January 8, 2000 || Socorro || LINEAR || KOR || align=right | 6.3 km || 
|-id=139 bgcolor=#E9E9E9
| 67139 ||  || — || January 8, 2000 || Socorro || LINEAR || — || align=right | 3.9 km || 
|-id=140 bgcolor=#d6d6d6
| 67140 ||  || — || January 8, 2000 || Socorro || LINEAR || — || align=right | 13 km || 
|-id=141 bgcolor=#E9E9E9
| 67141 ||  || — || January 7, 2000 || Socorro || LINEAR || — || align=right | 4.6 km || 
|-id=142 bgcolor=#E9E9E9
| 67142 ||  || — || January 7, 2000 || Socorro || LINEAR || — || align=right | 4.8 km || 
|-id=143 bgcolor=#E9E9E9
| 67143 ||  || — || January 7, 2000 || Socorro || LINEAR || — || align=right | 3.8 km || 
|-id=144 bgcolor=#E9E9E9
| 67144 ||  || — || January 7, 2000 || Socorro || LINEAR || — || align=right | 2.5 km || 
|-id=145 bgcolor=#E9E9E9
| 67145 ||  || — || January 7, 2000 || Socorro || LINEAR || — || align=right | 4.0 km || 
|-id=146 bgcolor=#d6d6d6
| 67146 ||  || — || January 7, 2000 || Socorro || LINEAR || — || align=right | 4.6 km || 
|-id=147 bgcolor=#d6d6d6
| 67147 ||  || — || January 7, 2000 || Socorro || LINEAR || EOS || align=right | 4.8 km || 
|-id=148 bgcolor=#E9E9E9
| 67148 ||  || — || January 8, 2000 || Socorro || LINEAR || — || align=right | 6.8 km || 
|-id=149 bgcolor=#E9E9E9
| 67149 ||  || — || January 8, 2000 || Socorro || LINEAR || — || align=right | 5.5 km || 
|-id=150 bgcolor=#d6d6d6
| 67150 ||  || — || January 8, 2000 || Socorro || LINEAR || — || align=right | 3.6 km || 
|-id=151 bgcolor=#E9E9E9
| 67151 ||  || — || January 8, 2000 || Socorro || LINEAR || INO || align=right | 2.7 km || 
|-id=152 bgcolor=#E9E9E9
| 67152 ||  || — || January 8, 2000 || Socorro || LINEAR || — || align=right | 7.6 km || 
|-id=153 bgcolor=#E9E9E9
| 67153 ||  || — || January 8, 2000 || Socorro || LINEAR || EUN || align=right | 3.1 km || 
|-id=154 bgcolor=#d6d6d6
| 67154 ||  || — || January 8, 2000 || Socorro || LINEAR || — || align=right | 16 km || 
|-id=155 bgcolor=#d6d6d6
| 67155 ||  || — || January 8, 2000 || Socorro || LINEAR || — || align=right | 11 km || 
|-id=156 bgcolor=#d6d6d6
| 67156 ||  || — || January 8, 2000 || Socorro || LINEAR || 7:4 || align=right | 8.8 km || 
|-id=157 bgcolor=#d6d6d6
| 67157 ||  || — || January 8, 2000 || Socorro || LINEAR || — || align=right | 14 km || 
|-id=158 bgcolor=#E9E9E9
| 67158 ||  || — || January 9, 2000 || Socorro || LINEAR || EUN || align=right | 4.9 km || 
|-id=159 bgcolor=#E9E9E9
| 67159 ||  || — || January 9, 2000 || Socorro || LINEAR || — || align=right | 3.4 km || 
|-id=160 bgcolor=#E9E9E9
| 67160 ||  || — || January 9, 2000 || Socorro || LINEAR || — || align=right | 5.6 km || 
|-id=161 bgcolor=#d6d6d6
| 67161 ||  || — || January 8, 2000 || Nachi-Katsuura || Y. Shimizu, T. Urata || — || align=right | 5.5 km || 
|-id=162 bgcolor=#fefefe
| 67162 ||  || — || January 8, 2000 || Kitt Peak || Spacewatch || V || align=right | 1.4 km || 
|-id=163 bgcolor=#E9E9E9
| 67163 ||  || — || January 7, 2000 || Anderson Mesa || LONEOS || — || align=right | 6.7 km || 
|-id=164 bgcolor=#E9E9E9
| 67164 ||  || — || January 3, 2000 || Socorro || LINEAR || — || align=right | 5.2 km || 
|-id=165 bgcolor=#d6d6d6
| 67165 ||  || — || January 4, 2000 || Kitt Peak || Spacewatch || — || align=right | 5.4 km || 
|-id=166 bgcolor=#d6d6d6
| 67166 ||  || — || January 4, 2000 || Socorro || LINEAR || — || align=right | 12 km || 
|-id=167 bgcolor=#d6d6d6
| 67167 ||  || — || January 5, 2000 || Socorro || LINEAR || THM || align=right | 4.6 km || 
|-id=168 bgcolor=#d6d6d6
| 67168 ||  || — || January 6, 2000 || Socorro || LINEAR || MEL || align=right | 12 km || 
|-id=169 bgcolor=#d6d6d6
| 67169 ||  || — || January 7, 2000 || Anderson Mesa || LONEOS || 7:4 || align=right | 13 km || 
|-id=170 bgcolor=#d6d6d6
| 67170 ||  || — || January 8, 2000 || Socorro || LINEAR || URS || align=right | 8.6 km || 
|-id=171 bgcolor=#E9E9E9
| 67171 ||  || — || January 8, 2000 || Socorro || LINEAR || MAR || align=right | 2.4 km || 
|-id=172 bgcolor=#E9E9E9
| 67172 ||  || — || January 30, 2000 || Socorro || LINEAR || DOR || align=right | 7.7 km || 
|-id=173 bgcolor=#E9E9E9
| 67173 ||  || — || January 30, 2000 || Socorro || LINEAR || — || align=right | 5.5 km || 
|-id=174 bgcolor=#fefefe
| 67174 ||  || — || January 30, 2000 || Socorro || LINEAR || NYS || align=right | 1.9 km || 
|-id=175 bgcolor=#fefefe
| 67175 ||  || — || January 31, 2000 || Socorro || LINEAR || Hslow || align=right | 2.5 km || 
|-id=176 bgcolor=#d6d6d6
| 67176 ||  || — || January 26, 2000 || Kitt Peak || Spacewatch || HYG || align=right | 6.1 km || 
|-id=177 bgcolor=#d6d6d6
| 67177 ||  || — || January 30, 2000 || Kitt Peak || Spacewatch || THM || align=right | 5.5 km || 
|-id=178 bgcolor=#d6d6d6
| 67178 ||  || — || January 30, 2000 || Socorro || LINEAR || AEG || align=right | 9.8 km || 
|-id=179 bgcolor=#d6d6d6
| 67179 ||  || — || January 30, 2000 || Socorro || LINEAR || — || align=right | 4.8 km || 
|-id=180 bgcolor=#fefefe
| 67180 ||  || — || January 30, 2000 || Socorro || LINEAR || — || align=right | 3.4 km || 
|-id=181 bgcolor=#d6d6d6
| 67181 ||  || — || January 30, 2000 || Socorro || LINEAR || THM || align=right | 8.5 km || 
|-id=182 bgcolor=#d6d6d6
| 67182 ||  || — || January 29, 2000 || Socorro || LINEAR || — || align=right | 6.9 km || 
|-id=183 bgcolor=#d6d6d6
| 67183 ||  || — || January 30, 2000 || Catalina || CSS || — || align=right | 7.0 km || 
|-id=184 bgcolor=#d6d6d6
| 67184 ||  || — || February 2, 2000 || Socorro || LINEAR || THM || align=right | 6.2 km || 
|-id=185 bgcolor=#d6d6d6
| 67185 ||  || — || February 2, 2000 || Socorro || LINEAR || — || align=right | 5.3 km || 
|-id=186 bgcolor=#d6d6d6
| 67186 ||  || — || February 2, 2000 || Socorro || LINEAR || — || align=right | 5.2 km || 
|-id=187 bgcolor=#E9E9E9
| 67187 ||  || — || February 2, 2000 || Socorro || LINEAR || — || align=right | 3.9 km || 
|-id=188 bgcolor=#fefefe
| 67188 ||  || — || February 2, 2000 || Socorro || LINEAR || NYS || align=right | 1.7 km || 
|-id=189 bgcolor=#d6d6d6
| 67189 ||  || — || February 2, 2000 || Socorro || LINEAR || HYG || align=right | 6.9 km || 
|-id=190 bgcolor=#d6d6d6
| 67190 ||  || — || February 2, 2000 || Socorro || LINEAR || HYG || align=right | 8.9 km || 
|-id=191 bgcolor=#d6d6d6
| 67191 ||  || — || February 3, 2000 || Socorro || LINEAR || HYG || align=right | 8.9 km || 
|-id=192 bgcolor=#E9E9E9
| 67192 ||  || — || February 2, 2000 || Socorro || LINEAR || — || align=right | 5.0 km || 
|-id=193 bgcolor=#d6d6d6
| 67193 ||  || — || February 5, 2000 || Socorro || LINEAR || — || align=right | 13 km || 
|-id=194 bgcolor=#d6d6d6
| 67194 ||  || — || February 2, 2000 || Socorro || LINEAR || — || align=right | 4.6 km || 
|-id=195 bgcolor=#E9E9E9
| 67195 ||  || — || February 6, 2000 || Socorro || LINEAR || MIT || align=right | 5.7 km || 
|-id=196 bgcolor=#E9E9E9
| 67196 ||  || — || February 3, 2000 || Socorro || LINEAR || — || align=right | 2.8 km || 
|-id=197 bgcolor=#d6d6d6
| 67197 ||  || — || February 8, 2000 || Kitt Peak || Spacewatch || THM || align=right | 6.7 km || 
|-id=198 bgcolor=#fefefe
| 67198 ||  || — || February 6, 2000 || Socorro || LINEAR || — || align=right | 1.9 km || 
|-id=199 bgcolor=#d6d6d6
| 67199 ||  || — || February 6, 2000 || Socorro || LINEAR || — || align=right | 12 km || 
|-id=200 bgcolor=#d6d6d6
| 67200 ||  || — || February 12, 2000 || Oaxaca || J. M. Roe || — || align=right | 7.7 km || 
|}

67201–67300 

|-bgcolor=#E9E9E9
| 67201 ||  || — || February 8, 2000 || Socorro || LINEAR || — || align=right | 3.3 km || 
|-id=202 bgcolor=#d6d6d6
| 67202 ||  || — || February 5, 2000 || Catalina || CSS || TIR || align=right | 8.0 km || 
|-id=203 bgcolor=#d6d6d6
| 67203 ||  || — || February 3, 2000 || Socorro || LINEAR || 3:2 || align=right | 11 km || 
|-id=204 bgcolor=#fefefe
| 67204 ||  || — || February 28, 2000 || Socorro || LINEAR || V || align=right | 3.8 km || 
|-id=205 bgcolor=#d6d6d6
| 67205 ||  || — || February 29, 2000 || Oaxaca || J. M. Roe || — || align=right | 7.4 km || 
|-id=206 bgcolor=#E9E9E9
| 67206 ||  || — || February 27, 2000 || Catalina || CSS || — || align=right | 4.1 km || 
|-id=207 bgcolor=#d6d6d6
| 67207 ||  || — || February 29, 2000 || Socorro || LINEAR || THM || align=right | 6.7 km || 
|-id=208 bgcolor=#d6d6d6
| 67208 ||  || — || February 29, 2000 || Socorro || LINEAR || — || align=right | 11 km || 
|-id=209 bgcolor=#E9E9E9
| 67209 ||  || — || February 29, 2000 || Socorro || LINEAR || HOF || align=right | 5.1 km || 
|-id=210 bgcolor=#d6d6d6
| 67210 ||  || — || February 29, 2000 || Socorro || LINEAR || HYG || align=right | 9.8 km || 
|-id=211 bgcolor=#E9E9E9
| 67211 ||  || — || February 29, 2000 || Socorro || LINEAR || — || align=right | 2.0 km || 
|-id=212 bgcolor=#fefefe
| 67212 ||  || — || February 29, 2000 || Socorro || LINEAR || V || align=right | 1.4 km || 
|-id=213 bgcolor=#d6d6d6
| 67213 ||  || — || February 29, 2000 || Socorro || LINEAR || — || align=right | 4.2 km || 
|-id=214 bgcolor=#d6d6d6
| 67214 ||  || — || February 29, 2000 || Socorro || LINEAR || THM || align=right | 6.0 km || 
|-id=215 bgcolor=#d6d6d6
| 67215 ||  || — || February 29, 2000 || Socorro || LINEAR || URS || align=right | 9.8 km || 
|-id=216 bgcolor=#d6d6d6
| 67216 ||  || — || February 29, 2000 || Socorro || LINEAR || — || align=right | 8.8 km || 
|-id=217 bgcolor=#d6d6d6
| 67217 ||  || — || February 29, 2000 || Socorro || LINEAR || KOR || align=right | 3.3 km || 
|-id=218 bgcolor=#d6d6d6
| 67218 ||  || — || February 29, 2000 || Socorro || LINEAR || 7:4 || align=right | 10 km || 
|-id=219 bgcolor=#E9E9E9
| 67219 ||  || — || February 29, 2000 || Socorro || LINEAR || — || align=right | 2.4 km || 
|-id=220 bgcolor=#E9E9E9
| 67220 ||  || — || February 29, 2000 || Socorro || LINEAR || ADE || align=right | 2.9 km || 
|-id=221 bgcolor=#fefefe
| 67221 ||  || — || February 29, 2000 || Socorro || LINEAR || NYS || align=right | 1.9 km || 
|-id=222 bgcolor=#fefefe
| 67222 ||  || — || February 29, 2000 || Socorro || LINEAR || FLO || align=right | 1.9 km || 
|-id=223 bgcolor=#fefefe
| 67223 ||  || — || February 28, 2000 || Socorro || LINEAR || V || align=right | 1.8 km || 
|-id=224 bgcolor=#E9E9E9
| 67224 ||  || — || February 28, 2000 || Socorro || LINEAR || HOF || align=right | 5.8 km || 
|-id=225 bgcolor=#E9E9E9
| 67225 ||  || — || February 29, 2000 || Socorro || LINEAR || GEF || align=right | 3.6 km || 
|-id=226 bgcolor=#d6d6d6
| 67226 ||  || — || February 29, 2000 || Socorro || LINEAR || 7:4 || align=right | 15 km || 
|-id=227 bgcolor=#d6d6d6
| 67227 ||  || — || February 29, 2000 || Socorro || LINEAR || MEL || align=right | 11 km || 
|-id=228 bgcolor=#d6d6d6
| 67228 ||  || — || February 28, 2000 || Socorro || LINEAR || — || align=right | 10 km || 
|-id=229 bgcolor=#d6d6d6
| 67229 ||  || — || February 29, 2000 || Socorro || LINEAR || HYG || align=right | 8.9 km || 
|-id=230 bgcolor=#fefefe
| 67230 || 2000 EB || — || March 12, 2000 || Socorro || LINEAR || — || align=right | 3.3 km || 
|-id=231 bgcolor=#d6d6d6
| 67231 || 2000 EH || — || March 1, 2000 || Kitt Peak || Spacewatch || — || align=right | 4.9 km || 
|-id=232 bgcolor=#E9E9E9
| 67232 ||  || — || March 3, 2000 || Socorro || LINEAR || — || align=right | 4.4 km || 
|-id=233 bgcolor=#d6d6d6
| 67233 ||  || — || March 4, 2000 || Socorro || LINEAR || MEL || align=right | 11 km || 
|-id=234 bgcolor=#d6d6d6
| 67234 ||  || — || March 4, 2000 || Socorro || LINEAR || — || align=right | 6.4 km || 
|-id=235 bgcolor=#E9E9E9
| 67235 Fairbank ||  ||  || March 5, 2000 || Gnosca || S. Sposetti || — || align=right | 4.4 km || 
|-id=236 bgcolor=#fefefe
| 67236 ||  || — || March 5, 2000 || Socorro || LINEAR || FLO || align=right | 1.4 km || 
|-id=237 bgcolor=#fefefe
| 67237 ||  || — || March 8, 2000 || Kitt Peak || Spacewatch || — || align=right | 1.4 km || 
|-id=238 bgcolor=#fefefe
| 67238 ||  || — || March 8, 2000 || Socorro || LINEAR || H || align=right data-sort-value="0.96" | 960 m || 
|-id=239 bgcolor=#fefefe
| 67239 ||  || — || March 5, 2000 || Socorro || LINEAR || V || align=right | 1.9 km || 
|-id=240 bgcolor=#d6d6d6
| 67240 ||  || — || March 8, 2000 || Socorro || LINEAR || THM || align=right | 6.1 km || 
|-id=241 bgcolor=#E9E9E9
| 67241 ||  || — || March 9, 2000 || Socorro || LINEAR || — || align=right | 3.8 km || 
|-id=242 bgcolor=#d6d6d6
| 67242 ||  || — || March 9, 2000 || Socorro || LINEAR || THM || align=right | 5.9 km || 
|-id=243 bgcolor=#d6d6d6
| 67243 ||  || — || March 8, 2000 || Socorro || LINEAR || — || align=right | 9.8 km || 
|-id=244 bgcolor=#d6d6d6
| 67244 ||  || — || March 8, 2000 || Socorro || LINEAR || 7:4 || align=right | 13 km || 
|-id=245 bgcolor=#d6d6d6
| 67245 ||  || — || March 10, 2000 || Socorro || LINEAR || HYG || align=right | 5.8 km || 
|-id=246 bgcolor=#d6d6d6
| 67246 ||  || — || March 10, 2000 || Socorro || LINEAR || HIL3:2 || align=right | 23 km || 
|-id=247 bgcolor=#fefefe
| 67247 ||  || — || March 5, 2000 || Socorro || LINEAR || — || align=right | 1.9 km || 
|-id=248 bgcolor=#d6d6d6
| 67248 ||  || — || March 9, 2000 || Socorro || LINEAR || — || align=right | 14 km || 
|-id=249 bgcolor=#fefefe
| 67249 ||  || — || March 11, 2000 || Socorro || LINEAR || V || align=right | 2.3 km || 
|-id=250 bgcolor=#d6d6d6
| 67250 ||  || — || March 10, 2000 || Socorro || LINEAR || — || align=right | 9.1 km || 
|-id=251 bgcolor=#E9E9E9
| 67251 ||  || — || March 9, 2000 || Socorro || LINEAR || — || align=right | 4.4 km || 
|-id=252 bgcolor=#fefefe
| 67252 ||  || — || March 14, 2000 || Socorro || LINEAR || V || align=right | 2.1 km || 
|-id=253 bgcolor=#E9E9E9
| 67253 ||  || — || March 11, 2000 || Anderson Mesa || LONEOS || — || align=right | 2.9 km || 
|-id=254 bgcolor=#d6d6d6
| 67254 ||  || — || March 8, 2000 || Kitt Peak || Spacewatch || — || align=right | 6.8 km || 
|-id=255 bgcolor=#d6d6d6
| 67255 ||  || — || March 8, 2000 || Haleakala || NEAT || TIR || align=right | 6.6 km || 
|-id=256 bgcolor=#fefefe
| 67256 ||  || — || March 9, 2000 || Socorro || LINEAR || — || align=right | 2.0 km || 
|-id=257 bgcolor=#E9E9E9
| 67257 ||  || — || March 11, 2000 || Anderson Mesa || LONEOS || KRM || align=right | 5.9 km || 
|-id=258 bgcolor=#d6d6d6
| 67258 ||  || — || March 11, 2000 || Anderson Mesa || LONEOS || — || align=right | 5.3 km || 
|-id=259 bgcolor=#d6d6d6
| 67259 ||  || — || March 11, 2000 || Anderson Mesa || LONEOS || URS || align=right | 11 km || 
|-id=260 bgcolor=#d6d6d6
| 67260 ||  || — || March 11, 2000 || Anderson Mesa || LONEOS || CHA || align=right | 3.5 km || 
|-id=261 bgcolor=#d6d6d6
| 67261 ||  || — || March 11, 2000 || Anderson Mesa || LONEOS || EUP || align=right | 11 km || 
|-id=262 bgcolor=#E9E9E9
| 67262 ||  || — || March 12, 2000 || Socorro || LINEAR || — || align=right | 3.0 km || 
|-id=263 bgcolor=#d6d6d6
| 67263 ||  || — || March 5, 2000 || Haleakala || NEAT || — || align=right | 3.7 km || 
|-id=264 bgcolor=#fefefe
| 67264 ||  || — || March 6, 2000 || Haleakala || NEAT || — || align=right | 2.2 km || 
|-id=265 bgcolor=#fefefe
| 67265 ||  || — || March 12, 2000 || Anderson Mesa || LONEOS || — || align=right | 1.6 km || 
|-id=266 bgcolor=#fefefe
| 67266 ||  || — || March 3, 2000 || Socorro || LINEAR || — || align=right | 1.5 km || 
|-id=267 bgcolor=#d6d6d6
| 67267 ||  || — || March 5, 2000 || Socorro || LINEAR || — || align=right | 6.1 km || 
|-id=268 bgcolor=#d6d6d6
| 67268 ||  || — || March 5, 2000 || Socorro || LINEAR || 615 || align=right | 4.0 km || 
|-id=269 bgcolor=#fefefe
| 67269 ||  || — || March 29, 2000 || Oizumi || T. Kobayashi || — || align=right | 5.2 km || 
|-id=270 bgcolor=#d6d6d6
| 67270 ||  || — || March 28, 2000 || Socorro || LINEAR || — || align=right | 10 km || 
|-id=271 bgcolor=#d6d6d6
| 67271 ||  || — || March 29, 2000 || Socorro || LINEAR || EOS || align=right | 5.8 km || 
|-id=272 bgcolor=#d6d6d6
| 67272 ||  || — || March 27, 2000 || Anderson Mesa || LONEOS || KOR || align=right | 3.7 km || 
|-id=273 bgcolor=#E9E9E9
| 67273 ||  || — || March 29, 2000 || Socorro || LINEAR || EUN || align=right | 3.3 km || 
|-id=274 bgcolor=#E9E9E9
| 67274 ||  || — || March 29, 2000 || Socorro || LINEAR || — || align=right | 8.5 km || 
|-id=275 bgcolor=#E9E9E9
| 67275 ||  || — || March 29, 2000 || Socorro || LINEAR || — || align=right | 2.6 km || 
|-id=276 bgcolor=#E9E9E9
| 67276 ||  || — || March 29, 2000 || Socorro || LINEAR || NEM || align=right | 5.4 km || 
|-id=277 bgcolor=#E9E9E9
| 67277 ||  || — || March 29, 2000 || Socorro || LINEAR || — || align=right | 2.3 km || 
|-id=278 bgcolor=#fefefe
| 67278 ||  || — || March 29, 2000 || Socorro || LINEAR || — || align=right | 1.8 km || 
|-id=279 bgcolor=#fefefe
| 67279 ||  || — || March 29, 2000 || Socorro || LINEAR || — || align=right data-sort-value="0.98" | 980 m || 
|-id=280 bgcolor=#E9E9E9
| 67280 ||  || — || March 29, 2000 || Socorro || LINEAR || MAR || align=right | 3.3 km || 
|-id=281 bgcolor=#fefefe
| 67281 ||  || — || March 29, 2000 || Socorro || LINEAR || V || align=right | 1.3 km || 
|-id=282 bgcolor=#d6d6d6
| 67282 ||  || — || March 27, 2000 || Anderson Mesa || LONEOS || — || align=right | 5.3 km || 
|-id=283 bgcolor=#fefefe
| 67283 || 2000 GN || — || April 2, 2000 || Prescott || P. G. Comba || — || align=right | 2.3 km || 
|-id=284 bgcolor=#FA8072
| 67284 ||  || — || April 2, 2000 || Socorro || LINEAR || H || align=right | 1.9 km || 
|-id=285 bgcolor=#d6d6d6
| 67285 ||  || — || April 5, 2000 || Prescott || P. G. Comba || KOR || align=right | 2.9 km || 
|-id=286 bgcolor=#fefefe
| 67286 ||  || — || April 4, 2000 || Socorro || LINEAR || — || align=right | 4.4 km || 
|-id=287 bgcolor=#fefefe
| 67287 ||  || — || April 5, 2000 || Socorro || LINEAR || V || align=right | 1.6 km || 
|-id=288 bgcolor=#E9E9E9
| 67288 ||  || — || April 5, 2000 || Socorro || LINEAR || — || align=right | 2.6 km || 
|-id=289 bgcolor=#fefefe
| 67289 ||  || — || April 5, 2000 || Socorro || LINEAR || — || align=right | 1.7 km || 
|-id=290 bgcolor=#E9E9E9
| 67290 ||  || — || April 5, 2000 || Socorro || LINEAR || — || align=right | 4.1 km || 
|-id=291 bgcolor=#d6d6d6
| 67291 ||  || — || April 5, 2000 || Socorro || LINEAR || THM || align=right | 6.9 km || 
|-id=292 bgcolor=#E9E9E9
| 67292 ||  || — || April 5, 2000 || Socorro || LINEAR || — || align=right | 3.0 km || 
|-id=293 bgcolor=#d6d6d6
| 67293 ||  || — || April 5, 2000 || Socorro || LINEAR || EOS || align=right | 4.3 km || 
|-id=294 bgcolor=#fefefe
| 67294 ||  || — || April 5, 2000 || Socorro || LINEAR || — || align=right | 2.7 km || 
|-id=295 bgcolor=#fefefe
| 67295 ||  || — || April 5, 2000 || Socorro || LINEAR || — || align=right | 1.3 km || 
|-id=296 bgcolor=#E9E9E9
| 67296 ||  || — || April 13, 2000 || Socorro || LINEAR || EUN || align=right | 3.3 km || 
|-id=297 bgcolor=#fefefe
| 67297 ||  || — || April 4, 2000 || Socorro || LINEAR || ERI || align=right | 4.4 km || 
|-id=298 bgcolor=#d6d6d6
| 67298 ||  || — || April 4, 2000 || Socorro || LINEAR || EOS || align=right | 4.4 km || 
|-id=299 bgcolor=#E9E9E9
| 67299 ||  || — || April 6, 2000 || Socorro || LINEAR || — || align=right | 2.9 km || 
|-id=300 bgcolor=#fefefe
| 67300 ||  || — || April 7, 2000 || Socorro || LINEAR || V || align=right | 1.7 km || 
|}

67301–67400 

|-bgcolor=#fefefe
| 67301 ||  || — || April 7, 2000 || Socorro || LINEAR || — || align=right | 1.9 km || 
|-id=302 bgcolor=#fefefe
| 67302 ||  || — || April 8, 2000 || Socorro || LINEAR || H || align=right | 1.3 km || 
|-id=303 bgcolor=#E9E9E9
| 67303 ||  || — || April 7, 2000 || Anderson Mesa || LONEOS || — || align=right | 2.9 km || 
|-id=304 bgcolor=#d6d6d6
| 67304 ||  || — || April 7, 2000 || Anderson Mesa || LONEOS || — || align=right | 11 km || 
|-id=305 bgcolor=#E9E9E9
| 67305 ||  || — || April 7, 2000 || Socorro || LINEAR || — || align=right | 3.3 km || 
|-id=306 bgcolor=#d6d6d6
| 67306 ||  || — || April 10, 2000 || Haleakala || NEAT || — || align=right | 4.6 km || 
|-id=307 bgcolor=#E9E9E9
| 67307 ||  || — || April 5, 2000 || Socorro || LINEAR || — || align=right | 2.5 km || 
|-id=308 bgcolor=#d6d6d6
| 67308 Öveges || 2000 HD ||  || April 21, 2000 || Piszkéstető || K. Sárneczky, L. Kiss || EOS || align=right | 7.4 km || 
|-id=309 bgcolor=#fefefe
| 67309 ||  || — || April 25, 2000 || Kitt Peak || Spacewatch || — || align=right | 1.5 km || 
|-id=310 bgcolor=#E9E9E9
| 67310 ||  || — || April 27, 2000 || Socorro || LINEAR || — || align=right | 2.5 km || 
|-id=311 bgcolor=#E9E9E9
| 67311 ||  || — || April 28, 2000 || Socorro || LINEAR || — || align=right | 2.9 km || 
|-id=312 bgcolor=#E9E9E9
| 67312 ||  || — || April 28, 2000 || Socorro || LINEAR || — || align=right | 4.8 km || 
|-id=313 bgcolor=#E9E9E9
| 67313 ||  || — || April 29, 2000 || Socorro || LINEAR || — || align=right | 3.1 km || 
|-id=314 bgcolor=#fefefe
| 67314 ||  || — || April 27, 2000 || Anderson Mesa || LONEOS || — || align=right | 2.2 km || 
|-id=315 bgcolor=#d6d6d6
| 67315 ||  || — || April 29, 2000 || Socorro || LINEAR || — || align=right | 5.0 km || 
|-id=316 bgcolor=#d6d6d6
| 67316 ||  || — || April 30, 2000 || Socorro || LINEAR || — || align=right | 5.7 km || 
|-id=317 bgcolor=#E9E9E9
| 67317 ||  || — || April 29, 2000 || Socorro || LINEAR || — || align=right | 2.0 km || 
|-id=318 bgcolor=#E9E9E9
| 67318 ||  || — || April 29, 2000 || Socorro || LINEAR || — || align=right | 2.5 km || 
|-id=319 bgcolor=#fefefe
| 67319 ||  || — || April 24, 2000 || Anderson Mesa || LONEOS || — || align=right | 1.9 km || 
|-id=320 bgcolor=#fefefe
| 67320 ||  || — || April 25, 2000 || Anderson Mesa || LONEOS || FLO || align=right | 1.2 km || 
|-id=321 bgcolor=#fefefe
| 67321 ||  || — || April 25, 2000 || Anderson Mesa || LONEOS || — || align=right | 1.4 km || 
|-id=322 bgcolor=#d6d6d6
| 67322 ||  || — || April 25, 2000 || Kitt Peak || Spacewatch || — || align=right | 5.1 km || 
|-id=323 bgcolor=#fefefe
| 67323 ||  || — || April 26, 2000 || Anderson Mesa || LONEOS || FLO || align=right | 1.2 km || 
|-id=324 bgcolor=#d6d6d6
| 67324 ||  || — || April 24, 2000 || Anderson Mesa || LONEOS || — || align=right | 5.4 km || 
|-id=325 bgcolor=#fefefe
| 67325 ||  || — || April 26, 2000 || Anderson Mesa || LONEOS || V || align=right | 1.7 km || 
|-id=326 bgcolor=#E9E9E9
| 67326 ||  || — || April 27, 2000 || Anderson Mesa || LONEOS || — || align=right | 2.3 km || 
|-id=327 bgcolor=#fefefe
| 67327 ||  || — || April 27, 2000 || Socorro || LINEAR || FLO || align=right | 3.3 km || 
|-id=328 bgcolor=#E9E9E9
| 67328 ||  || — || April 28, 2000 || Anderson Mesa || LONEOS || — || align=right | 3.8 km || 
|-id=329 bgcolor=#E9E9E9
| 67329 ||  || — || April 28, 2000 || Anderson Mesa || LONEOS || MAR || align=right | 3.3 km || 
|-id=330 bgcolor=#fefefe
| 67330 ||  || — || April 28, 2000 || Anderson Mesa || LONEOS || — || align=right | 2.3 km || 
|-id=331 bgcolor=#fefefe
| 67331 ||  || — || April 28, 2000 || Socorro || LINEAR || — || align=right | 1.6 km || 
|-id=332 bgcolor=#fefefe
| 67332 ||  || — || April 28, 2000 || Anderson Mesa || LONEOS || H || align=right | 1.9 km || 
|-id=333 bgcolor=#d6d6d6
| 67333 ||  || — || April 27, 2000 || Anderson Mesa || LONEOS || — || align=right | 7.4 km || 
|-id=334 bgcolor=#E9E9E9
| 67334 ||  || — || May 3, 2000 || Socorro || LINEAR || — || align=right | 7.1 km || 
|-id=335 bgcolor=#fefefe
| 67335 ||  || — || May 2, 2000 || Socorro || LINEAR || H || align=right | 1.5 km || 
|-id=336 bgcolor=#fefefe
| 67336 ||  || — || May 3, 2000 || Socorro || LINEAR || — || align=right | 2.0 km || 
|-id=337 bgcolor=#E9E9E9
| 67337 ||  || — || May 3, 2000 || Socorro || LINEAR || GEF || align=right | 2.6 km || 
|-id=338 bgcolor=#fefefe
| 67338 ||  || — || May 5, 2000 || Socorro || LINEAR || — || align=right | 2.2 km || 
|-id=339 bgcolor=#fefefe
| 67339 ||  || — || May 5, 2000 || Socorro || LINEAR || V || align=right | 1.5 km || 
|-id=340 bgcolor=#d6d6d6
| 67340 ||  || — || May 6, 2000 || Socorro || LINEAR || HIL3:2 || align=right | 16 km || 
|-id=341 bgcolor=#E9E9E9
| 67341 ||  || — || May 6, 2000 || Socorro || LINEAR || — || align=right | 5.5 km || 
|-id=342 bgcolor=#d6d6d6
| 67342 ||  || — || May 7, 2000 || Socorro || LINEAR || — || align=right | 5.5 km || 
|-id=343 bgcolor=#fefefe
| 67343 ||  || — || May 7, 2000 || Socorro || LINEAR || — || align=right | 3.9 km || 
|-id=344 bgcolor=#E9E9E9
| 67344 ||  || — || May 7, 2000 || Socorro || LINEAR || — || align=right | 5.5 km || 
|-id=345 bgcolor=#fefefe
| 67345 ||  || — || May 9, 2000 || Socorro || LINEAR || V || align=right | 1.8 km || 
|-id=346 bgcolor=#fefefe
| 67346 ||  || — || May 6, 2000 || Socorro || LINEAR || — || align=right | 5.1 km || 
|-id=347 bgcolor=#E9E9E9
| 67347 ||  || — || May 9, 2000 || Socorro || LINEAR || — || align=right | 5.0 km || 
|-id=348 bgcolor=#d6d6d6
| 67348 ||  || — || May 6, 2000 || Socorro || LINEAR || BRA || align=right | 5.1 km || 
|-id=349 bgcolor=#E9E9E9
| 67349 ||  || — || May 6, 2000 || Socorro || LINEAR || GEF || align=right | 3.8 km || 
|-id=350 bgcolor=#d6d6d6
| 67350 ||  || — || May 1, 2000 || Kitt Peak || Spacewatch || EOS || align=right | 4.4 km || 
|-id=351 bgcolor=#E9E9E9
| 67351 ||  || — || May 5, 2000 || Socorro || LINEAR || — || align=right | 3.1 km || 
|-id=352 bgcolor=#fefefe
| 67352 ||  || — || May 2, 2000 || Kitt Peak || Spacewatch || NYS || align=right | 3.4 km || 
|-id=353 bgcolor=#d6d6d6
| 67353 ||  || — || May 7, 2000 || Socorro || LINEAR || — || align=right | 4.2 km || 
|-id=354 bgcolor=#fefefe
| 67354 ||  || — || May 26, 2000 || Socorro || LINEAR || — || align=right | 2.6 km || 
|-id=355 bgcolor=#fefefe
| 67355 ||  || — || May 28, 2000 || Reedy Creek || J. Broughton || — || align=right | 1.7 km || 
|-id=356 bgcolor=#d6d6d6
| 67356 ||  || — || May 28, 2000 || Socorro || LINEAR || EOS || align=right | 4.4 km || 
|-id=357 bgcolor=#d6d6d6
| 67357 ||  || — || May 28, 2000 || Socorro || LINEAR || KOR || align=right | 3.2 km || 
|-id=358 bgcolor=#d6d6d6
| 67358 ||  || — || May 28, 2000 || Socorro || LINEAR || THM || align=right | 8.2 km || 
|-id=359 bgcolor=#d6d6d6
| 67359 ||  || — || May 24, 2000 || Kitt Peak || Spacewatch || — || align=right | 4.7 km || 
|-id=360 bgcolor=#d6d6d6
| 67360 ||  || — || May 30, 2000 || Kitt Peak || Spacewatch || THM || align=right | 5.5 km || 
|-id=361 bgcolor=#fefefe
| 67361 ||  || — || May 31, 2000 || Kitt Peak || Spacewatch || — || align=right | 1.6 km || 
|-id=362 bgcolor=#E9E9E9
| 67362 ||  || — || May 28, 2000 || Socorro || LINEAR || — || align=right | 4.3 km || 
|-id=363 bgcolor=#d6d6d6
| 67363 ||  || — || May 28, 2000 || Socorro || LINEAR || — || align=right | 6.6 km || 
|-id=364 bgcolor=#d6d6d6
| 67364 ||  || — || May 28, 2000 || Socorro || LINEAR || — || align=right | 7.1 km || 
|-id=365 bgcolor=#fefefe
| 67365 ||  || — || June 6, 2000 || Kitt Peak || Spacewatch || V || align=right | 1.3 km || 
|-id=366 bgcolor=#fefefe
| 67366 ||  || — || June 8, 2000 || Socorro || LINEAR || H || align=right | 1.6 km || 
|-id=367 bgcolor=#FFC2E0
| 67367 ||  || — || June 7, 2000 || Socorro || LINEAR || AMO +1kmPHA || align=right | 1.4 km || 
|-id=368 bgcolor=#d6d6d6
| 67368 ||  || — || June 4, 2000 || Haleakala || NEAT || HIL3:2 || align=right | 18 km || 
|-id=369 bgcolor=#E9E9E9
| 67369 ||  || — || June 29, 2000 || Reedy Creek || J. Broughton || — || align=right | 2.6 km || 
|-id=370 bgcolor=#E9E9E9
| 67370 ||  || — || July 3, 2000 || Socorro || LINEAR || PAL || align=right | 5.8 km || 
|-id=371 bgcolor=#fefefe
| 67371 ||  || — || July 7, 2000 || Socorro || LINEAR || — || align=right | 2.6 km || 
|-id=372 bgcolor=#fefefe
| 67372 ||  || — || July 5, 2000 || Anderson Mesa || LONEOS || PHO || align=right | 3.1 km || 
|-id=373 bgcolor=#fefefe
| 67373 ||  || — || July 5, 2000 || Anderson Mesa || LONEOS || — || align=right | 2.4 km || 
|-id=374 bgcolor=#fefefe
| 67374 ||  || — || July 5, 2000 || Anderson Mesa || LONEOS || NYS || align=right | 1.3 km || 
|-id=375 bgcolor=#E9E9E9
| 67375 ||  || — || July 5, 2000 || Anderson Mesa || LONEOS || — || align=right | 3.6 km || 
|-id=376 bgcolor=#fefefe
| 67376 ||  || — || July 3, 2000 || Kitt Peak || Spacewatch || — || align=right | 2.9 km || 
|-id=377 bgcolor=#d6d6d6
| 67377 ||  || — || July 26, 2000 || Farpoint || Farpoint Obs. || EOS || align=right | 6.0 km || 
|-id=378 bgcolor=#fefefe
| 67378 ||  || — || July 29, 2000 || Socorro || LINEAR || H || align=right | 3.2 km || 
|-id=379 bgcolor=#d6d6d6
| 67379 ||  || — || July 24, 2000 || Socorro || LINEAR || — || align=right | 8.1 km || 
|-id=380 bgcolor=#fefefe
| 67380 ||  || — || July 29, 2000 || Socorro || LINEAR || — || align=right | 2.1 km || 
|-id=381 bgcolor=#FFC2E0
| 67381 ||  || — || July 30, 2000 || Socorro || LINEAR || APOPHA || align=right data-sort-value="0.39" | 390 m || 
|-id=382 bgcolor=#d6d6d6
| 67382 ||  || — || July 23, 2000 || Socorro || LINEAR || — || align=right | 8.9 km || 
|-id=383 bgcolor=#fefefe
| 67383 ||  || — || July 23, 2000 || Socorro || LINEAR || FLO || align=right | 1.4 km || 
|-id=384 bgcolor=#d6d6d6
| 67384 ||  || — || July 23, 2000 || Socorro || LINEAR || — || align=right | 5.1 km || 
|-id=385 bgcolor=#fefefe
| 67385 ||  || — || July 30, 2000 || Socorro || LINEAR || PHO || align=right | 2.3 km || 
|-id=386 bgcolor=#fefefe
| 67386 ||  || — || July 30, 2000 || Socorro || LINEAR || FLO || align=right | 1.7 km || 
|-id=387 bgcolor=#fefefe
| 67387 ||  || — || July 30, 2000 || Socorro || LINEAR || — || align=right | 2.3 km || 
|-id=388 bgcolor=#fefefe
| 67388 ||  || — || July 30, 2000 || Socorro || LINEAR || LCI || align=right | 2.4 km || 
|-id=389 bgcolor=#fefefe
| 67389 ||  || — || July 30, 2000 || Socorro || LINEAR || H || align=right | 1.5 km || 
|-id=390 bgcolor=#fefefe
| 67390 ||  || — || July 31, 2000 || Socorro || LINEAR || — || align=right | 2.2 km || 
|-id=391 bgcolor=#fefefe
| 67391 ||  || — || July 31, 2000 || Socorro || LINEAR || — || align=right | 2.1 km || 
|-id=392 bgcolor=#fefefe
| 67392 ||  || — || July 29, 2000 || Anderson Mesa || LONEOS || V || align=right | 1.4 km || 
|-id=393 bgcolor=#d6d6d6
| 67393 ||  || — || July 29, 2000 || Anderson Mesa || LONEOS || THM || align=right | 5.8 km || 
|-id=394 bgcolor=#fefefe
| 67394 ||  || — || July 31, 2000 || Socorro || LINEAR || FLO || align=right | 1.6 km || 
|-id=395 bgcolor=#fefefe
| 67395 || 2000 PR || — || August 1, 2000 || Socorro || LINEAR || fast? || align=right | 1.5 km || 
|-id=396 bgcolor=#fefefe
| 67396 ||  || — || August 2, 2000 || Socorro || LINEAR || FLO || align=right | 1.2 km || 
|-id=397 bgcolor=#fefefe
| 67397 ||  || — || August 3, 2000 || Bisei SG Center || BATTeRS || V || align=right | 2.0 km || 
|-id=398 bgcolor=#d6d6d6
| 67398 ||  || — || August 5, 2000 || Haleakala || NEAT || — || align=right | 6.8 km || 
|-id=399 bgcolor=#FFC2E0
| 67399 ||  || — || August 3, 2000 || Socorro || LINEAR || APO +1km || align=right data-sort-value="0.80" | 800 m || 
|-id=400 bgcolor=#fefefe
| 67400 ||  || — || August 1, 2000 || Socorro || LINEAR || V || align=right | 2.2 km || 
|}

67401–67500 

|-bgcolor=#E9E9E9
| 67401 ||  || — || August 1, 2000 || Socorro || LINEAR || — || align=right | 5.1 km || 
|-id=402 bgcolor=#fefefe
| 67402 ||  || — || August 2, 2000 || Socorro || LINEAR || FLO || align=right | 1.3 km || 
|-id=403 bgcolor=#fefefe
| 67403 ||  || — || August 3, 2000 || Socorro || LINEAR || — || align=right | 2.2 km || 
|-id=404 bgcolor=#fefefe
| 67404 ||  || — || August 5, 2000 || Haleakala || NEAT || H || align=right | 1.7 km || 
|-id=405 bgcolor=#fefefe
| 67405 ||  || — || August 24, 2000 || Socorro || LINEAR || — || align=right | 1.6 km || 
|-id=406 bgcolor=#fefefe
| 67406 ||  || — || August 24, 2000 || Socorro || LINEAR || — || align=right | 1.5 km || 
|-id=407 bgcolor=#fefefe
| 67407 ||  || — || August 24, 2000 || Socorro || LINEAR || — || align=right | 2.6 km || 
|-id=408 bgcolor=#fefefe
| 67408 ||  || — || August 24, 2000 || Socorro || LINEAR || — || align=right | 2.0 km || 
|-id=409 bgcolor=#fefefe
| 67409 ||  || — || August 24, 2000 || Socorro || LINEAR || — || align=right | 1.5 km || 
|-id=410 bgcolor=#fefefe
| 67410 ||  || — || August 24, 2000 || Socorro || LINEAR || FLO || align=right | 1.5 km || 
|-id=411 bgcolor=#fefefe
| 67411 ||  || — || August 26, 2000 || Ondřejov || P. Kušnirák, P. Pravec || — || align=right | 1.5 km || 
|-id=412 bgcolor=#fefefe
| 67412 ||  || — || August 24, 2000 || Socorro || LINEAR || — || align=right | 2.1 km || 
|-id=413 bgcolor=#d6d6d6
| 67413 ||  || — || August 24, 2000 || Socorro || LINEAR || EMA || align=right | 8.1 km || 
|-id=414 bgcolor=#E9E9E9
| 67414 ||  || — || August 26, 2000 || Socorro || LINEAR || — || align=right | 3.9 km || 
|-id=415 bgcolor=#fefefe
| 67415 ||  || — || August 28, 2000 || Socorro || LINEAR || — || align=right | 2.5 km || 
|-id=416 bgcolor=#fefefe
| 67416 ||  || — || August 28, 2000 || Socorro || LINEAR || — || align=right | 2.3 km || 
|-id=417 bgcolor=#fefefe
| 67417 ||  || — || August 28, 2000 || Socorro || LINEAR || V || align=right | 1.9 km || 
|-id=418 bgcolor=#fefefe
| 67418 ||  || — || August 29, 2000 || Višnjan Observatory || K. Korlević || — || align=right | 2.2 km || 
|-id=419 bgcolor=#fefefe
| 67419 ||  || — || August 24, 2000 || Socorro || LINEAR || V || align=right | 1.5 km || 
|-id=420 bgcolor=#fefefe
| 67420 ||  || — || August 24, 2000 || Socorro || LINEAR || — || align=right | 1.7 km || 
|-id=421 bgcolor=#fefefe
| 67421 ||  || — || August 24, 2000 || Socorro || LINEAR || — || align=right | 3.0 km || 
|-id=422 bgcolor=#fefefe
| 67422 ||  || — || August 24, 2000 || Socorro || LINEAR || — || align=right | 1.9 km || 
|-id=423 bgcolor=#fefefe
| 67423 ||  || — || August 25, 2000 || Socorro || LINEAR || — || align=right | 2.0 km || 
|-id=424 bgcolor=#fefefe
| 67424 ||  || — || August 25, 2000 || Socorro || LINEAR || — || align=right | 2.1 km || 
|-id=425 bgcolor=#fefefe
| 67425 ||  || — || August 25, 2000 || Socorro || LINEAR || — || align=right | 1.9 km || 
|-id=426 bgcolor=#fefefe
| 67426 ||  || — || August 28, 2000 || Socorro || LINEAR || — || align=right | 3.4 km || 
|-id=427 bgcolor=#fefefe
| 67427 ||  || — || August 28, 2000 || Socorro || LINEAR || FLO || align=right | 1.5 km || 
|-id=428 bgcolor=#fefefe
| 67428 ||  || — || August 28, 2000 || Socorro || LINEAR || V || align=right | 2.5 km || 
|-id=429 bgcolor=#fefefe
| 67429 ||  || — || August 28, 2000 || Socorro || LINEAR || FLO || align=right | 1.8 km || 
|-id=430 bgcolor=#fefefe
| 67430 ||  || — || August 28, 2000 || Socorro || LINEAR || — || align=right | 1.9 km || 
|-id=431 bgcolor=#fefefe
| 67431 ||  || — || August 29, 2000 || Socorro || LINEAR || NYS || align=right | 1.5 km || 
|-id=432 bgcolor=#fefefe
| 67432 ||  || — || August 24, 2000 || Socorro || LINEAR || — || align=right | 1.4 km || 
|-id=433 bgcolor=#E9E9E9
| 67433 ||  || — || August 24, 2000 || Socorro || LINEAR || — || align=right | 2.2 km || 
|-id=434 bgcolor=#fefefe
| 67434 ||  || — || August 25, 2000 || Socorro || LINEAR || — || align=right | 1.5 km || 
|-id=435 bgcolor=#fefefe
| 67435 ||  || — || August 25, 2000 || Socorro || LINEAR || — || align=right | 2.0 km || 
|-id=436 bgcolor=#fefefe
| 67436 ||  || — || August 25, 2000 || Socorro || LINEAR || — || align=right | 2.1 km || 
|-id=437 bgcolor=#d6d6d6
| 67437 ||  || — || August 25, 2000 || Socorro || LINEAR || — || align=right | 4.6 km || 
|-id=438 bgcolor=#E9E9E9
| 67438 ||  || — || August 25, 2000 || Socorro || LINEAR || HNS || align=right | 4.0 km || 
|-id=439 bgcolor=#fefefe
| 67439 ||  || — || August 31, 2000 || Socorro || LINEAR || — || align=right | 2.3 km || 
|-id=440 bgcolor=#fefefe
| 67440 ||  || — || August 29, 2000 || Socorro || LINEAR || — || align=right | 1.9 km || 
|-id=441 bgcolor=#fefefe
| 67441 ||  || — || August 31, 2000 || Socorro || LINEAR || V || align=right | 1.8 km || 
|-id=442 bgcolor=#E9E9E9
| 67442 ||  || — || August 24, 2000 || Socorro || LINEAR || HEN || align=right | 2.2 km || 
|-id=443 bgcolor=#fefefe
| 67443 ||  || — || August 24, 2000 || Socorro || LINEAR || — || align=right | 1.7 km || 
|-id=444 bgcolor=#fefefe
| 67444 ||  || — || August 24, 2000 || Socorro || LINEAR || — || align=right | 1.4 km || 
|-id=445 bgcolor=#d6d6d6
| 67445 ||  || — || August 25, 2000 || Socorro || LINEAR || EOS || align=right | 3.6 km || 
|-id=446 bgcolor=#fefefe
| 67446 ||  || — || August 25, 2000 || Socorro || LINEAR || — || align=right | 3.4 km || 
|-id=447 bgcolor=#fefefe
| 67447 ||  || — || August 25, 2000 || Socorro || LINEAR || FLO || align=right | 2.8 km || 
|-id=448 bgcolor=#fefefe
| 67448 ||  || — || August 31, 2000 || Socorro || LINEAR || V || align=right | 1.7 km || 
|-id=449 bgcolor=#fefefe
| 67449 ||  || — || August 31, 2000 || Socorro || LINEAR || — || align=right | 2.6 km || 
|-id=450 bgcolor=#fefefe
| 67450 ||  || — || August 31, 2000 || Socorro || LINEAR || — || align=right | 1.6 km || 
|-id=451 bgcolor=#E9E9E9
| 67451 ||  || — || August 31, 2000 || Socorro || LINEAR || — || align=right | 8.9 km || 
|-id=452 bgcolor=#fefefe
| 67452 ||  || — || August 31, 2000 || Socorro || LINEAR || — || align=right | 1.7 km || 
|-id=453 bgcolor=#E9E9E9
| 67453 ||  || — || August 31, 2000 || Socorro || LINEAR || — || align=right | 5.7 km || 
|-id=454 bgcolor=#fefefe
| 67454 ||  || — || August 31, 2000 || Socorro || LINEAR || — || align=right | 1.8 km || 
|-id=455 bgcolor=#fefefe
| 67455 ||  || — || August 31, 2000 || Socorro || LINEAR || — || align=right | 1.7 km || 
|-id=456 bgcolor=#fefefe
| 67456 ||  || — || August 31, 2000 || Socorro || LINEAR || V || align=right | 1.6 km || 
|-id=457 bgcolor=#fefefe
| 67457 ||  || — || August 31, 2000 || Socorro || LINEAR || FLO || align=right | 2.1 km || 
|-id=458 bgcolor=#fefefe
| 67458 ||  || — || August 31, 2000 || Socorro || LINEAR || FLO || align=right | 2.0 km || 
|-id=459 bgcolor=#fefefe
| 67459 ||  || — || August 31, 2000 || Socorro || LINEAR || — || align=right | 6.3 km || 
|-id=460 bgcolor=#fefefe
| 67460 ||  || — || August 31, 2000 || Socorro || LINEAR || NYS || align=right | 1.9 km || 
|-id=461 bgcolor=#fefefe
| 67461 ||  || — || August 31, 2000 || Socorro || LINEAR || V || align=right | 2.1 km || 
|-id=462 bgcolor=#fefefe
| 67462 ||  || — || August 26, 2000 || Socorro || LINEAR || V || align=right | 1.6 km || 
|-id=463 bgcolor=#d6d6d6
| 67463 ||  || — || August 31, 2000 || Socorro || LINEAR || KOR || align=right | 3.6 km || 
|-id=464 bgcolor=#E9E9E9
| 67464 ||  || — || August 31, 2000 || Socorro || LINEAR || — || align=right | 3.4 km || 
|-id=465 bgcolor=#fefefe
| 67465 ||  || — || August 31, 2000 || Socorro || LINEAR || — || align=right | 1.3 km || 
|-id=466 bgcolor=#fefefe
| 67466 ||  || — || August 31, 2000 || Socorro || LINEAR || — || align=right | 3.3 km || 
|-id=467 bgcolor=#fefefe
| 67467 ||  || — || August 31, 2000 || Socorro || LINEAR || — || align=right | 1.0 km || 
|-id=468 bgcolor=#d6d6d6
| 67468 ||  || — || August 31, 2000 || Socorro || LINEAR || — || align=right | 5.5 km || 
|-id=469 bgcolor=#fefefe
| 67469 || 2000 RX || — || September 1, 2000 || Socorro || LINEAR || FLO || align=right | 1.9 km || 
|-id=470 bgcolor=#E9E9E9
| 67470 ||  || — || September 1, 2000 || Socorro || LINEAR || — || align=right | 4.9 km || 
|-id=471 bgcolor=#fefefe
| 67471 ||  || — || September 1, 2000 || Socorro || LINEAR || FLO || align=right | 2.7 km || 
|-id=472 bgcolor=#fefefe
| 67472 ||  || — || September 1, 2000 || Socorro || LINEAR || — || align=right | 1.7 km || 
|-id=473 bgcolor=#FA8072
| 67473 ||  || — || September 1, 2000 || Socorro || LINEAR || — || align=right | 1.3 km || 
|-id=474 bgcolor=#fefefe
| 67474 ||  || — || September 1, 2000 || Socorro || LINEAR || FLO || align=right | 1.4 km || 
|-id=475 bgcolor=#fefefe
| 67475 ||  || — || September 1, 2000 || Socorro || LINEAR || V || align=right | 2.1 km || 
|-id=476 bgcolor=#fefefe
| 67476 ||  || — || September 1, 2000 || Socorro || LINEAR || — || align=right | 3.1 km || 
|-id=477 bgcolor=#fefefe
| 67477 ||  || — || September 1, 2000 || Socorro || LINEAR || — || align=right | 1.6 km || 
|-id=478 bgcolor=#fefefe
| 67478 ||  || — || September 1, 2000 || Socorro || LINEAR || — || align=right | 2.2 km || 
|-id=479 bgcolor=#fefefe
| 67479 ||  || — || September 1, 2000 || Socorro || LINEAR || V || align=right | 1.9 km || 
|-id=480 bgcolor=#fefefe
| 67480 ||  || — || September 1, 2000 || Socorro || LINEAR || V || align=right | 1.9 km || 
|-id=481 bgcolor=#fefefe
| 67481 ||  || — || September 1, 2000 || Socorro || LINEAR || V || align=right | 1.9 km || 
|-id=482 bgcolor=#d6d6d6
| 67482 ||  || — || September 1, 2000 || Socorro || LINEAR || EOS || align=right | 3.6 km || 
|-id=483 bgcolor=#fefefe
| 67483 ||  || — || September 1, 2000 || Socorro || LINEAR || V || align=right | 1.6 km || 
|-id=484 bgcolor=#E9E9E9
| 67484 ||  || — || September 1, 2000 || Socorro || LINEAR || — || align=right | 5.6 km || 
|-id=485 bgcolor=#d6d6d6
| 67485 ||  || — || September 1, 2000 || Socorro || LINEAR || 7:4 || align=right | 11 km || 
|-id=486 bgcolor=#fefefe
| 67486 ||  || — || September 1, 2000 || Socorro || LINEAR || — || align=right | 1.9 km || 
|-id=487 bgcolor=#fefefe
| 67487 ||  || — || September 1, 2000 || Socorro || LINEAR || — || align=right | 2.1 km || 
|-id=488 bgcolor=#fefefe
| 67488 ||  || — || September 1, 2000 || Socorro || LINEAR || — || align=right | 2.0 km || 
|-id=489 bgcolor=#fefefe
| 67489 ||  || — || September 1, 2000 || Socorro || LINEAR || — || align=right | 2.3 km || 
|-id=490 bgcolor=#fefefe
| 67490 ||  || — || September 1, 2000 || Socorro || LINEAR || — || align=right | 1.8 km || 
|-id=491 bgcolor=#fefefe
| 67491 ||  || — || September 1, 2000 || Socorro || LINEAR || — || align=right | 1.4 km || 
|-id=492 bgcolor=#fefefe
| 67492 ||  || — || September 1, 2000 || Socorro || LINEAR || — || align=right | 2.4 km || 
|-id=493 bgcolor=#E9E9E9
| 67493 ||  || — || September 1, 2000 || Socorro || LINEAR || — || align=right | 3.8 km || 
|-id=494 bgcolor=#fefefe
| 67494 ||  || — || September 1, 2000 || Socorro || LINEAR || — || align=right | 2.3 km || 
|-id=495 bgcolor=#fefefe
| 67495 ||  || — || September 1, 2000 || Socorro || LINEAR || — || align=right | 2.0 km || 
|-id=496 bgcolor=#fefefe
| 67496 ||  || — || September 1, 2000 || Socorro || LINEAR || FLO || align=right | 3.4 km || 
|-id=497 bgcolor=#fefefe
| 67497 ||  || — || September 1, 2000 || Socorro || LINEAR || — || align=right | 1.5 km || 
|-id=498 bgcolor=#fefefe
| 67498 ||  || — || September 2, 2000 || Socorro || LINEAR || V || align=right | 2.4 km || 
|-id=499 bgcolor=#fefefe
| 67499 ||  || — || September 3, 2000 || Socorro || LINEAR || V || align=right | 1.7 km || 
|-id=500 bgcolor=#fefefe
| 67500 ||  || — || September 3, 2000 || Socorro || LINEAR || — || align=right | 1.4 km || 
|}

67501–67600 

|-bgcolor=#fefefe
| 67501 ||  || — || September 3, 2000 || Socorro || LINEAR || — || align=right | 3.1 km || 
|-id=502 bgcolor=#FA8072
| 67502 ||  || — || September 3, 2000 || Socorro || LINEAR || — || align=right | 3.1 km || 
|-id=503 bgcolor=#fefefe
| 67503 ||  || — || September 3, 2000 || Socorro || LINEAR || V || align=right | 1.9 km || 
|-id=504 bgcolor=#fefefe
| 67504 ||  || — || September 3, 2000 || Socorro || LINEAR || — || align=right | 1.3 km || 
|-id=505 bgcolor=#fefefe
| 67505 ||  || — || September 3, 2000 || Socorro || LINEAR || — || align=right | 1.6 km || 
|-id=506 bgcolor=#fefefe
| 67506 ||  || — || September 3, 2000 || Socorro || LINEAR || — || align=right | 2.2 km || 
|-id=507 bgcolor=#fefefe
| 67507 ||  || — || September 5, 2000 || Socorro || LINEAR || — || align=right | 2.1 km || 
|-id=508 bgcolor=#fefefe
| 67508 ||  || — || September 5, 2000 || Socorro || LINEAR || — || align=right | 3.8 km || 
|-id=509 bgcolor=#fefefe
| 67509 ||  || — || September 5, 2000 || Socorro || LINEAR || FLO || align=right | 2.0 km || 
|-id=510 bgcolor=#fefefe
| 67510 ||  || — || September 6, 2000 || Socorro || LINEAR || — || align=right | 2.0 km || 
|-id=511 bgcolor=#fefefe
| 67511 ||  || — || September 4, 2000 || Socorro || LINEAR || — || align=right | 6.8 km || 
|-id=512 bgcolor=#fefefe
| 67512 ||  || — || September 6, 2000 || Socorro || LINEAR || — || align=right | 7.6 km || 
|-id=513 bgcolor=#fefefe
| 67513 ||  || — || September 5, 2000 || Višnjan Observatory || K. Korlević || — || align=right | 1.7 km || 
|-id=514 bgcolor=#E9E9E9
| 67514 ||  || — || September 3, 2000 || Socorro || LINEAR || — || align=right | 4.3 km || 
|-id=515 bgcolor=#E9E9E9
| 67515 ||  || — || September 1, 2000 || Socorro || LINEAR || — || align=right | 6.3 km || 
|-id=516 bgcolor=#fefefe
| 67516 ||  || — || September 1, 2000 || Socorro || LINEAR || FLO || align=right | 1.0 km || 
|-id=517 bgcolor=#fefefe
| 67517 ||  || — || September 1, 2000 || Socorro || LINEAR || FLO || align=right | 2.1 km || 
|-id=518 bgcolor=#fefefe
| 67518 ||  || — || September 1, 2000 || Socorro || LINEAR || — || align=right | 1.9 km || 
|-id=519 bgcolor=#fefefe
| 67519 ||  || — || September 1, 2000 || Socorro || LINEAR || — || align=right | 4.8 km || 
|-id=520 bgcolor=#fefefe
| 67520 ||  || — || September 1, 2000 || Socorro || LINEAR || — || align=right | 2.4 km || 
|-id=521 bgcolor=#fefefe
| 67521 ||  || — || September 2, 2000 || Socorro || LINEAR || — || align=right | 2.5 km || 
|-id=522 bgcolor=#FA8072
| 67522 ||  || — || September 9, 2000 || Anderson Mesa || LONEOS || — || align=right | 1.6 km || 
|-id=523 bgcolor=#E9E9E9
| 67523 ||  || — || September 1, 2000 || Socorro || LINEAR || — || align=right | 3.4 km || 
|-id=524 bgcolor=#fefefe
| 67524 ||  || — || September 1, 2000 || Socorro || LINEAR || FLO || align=right | 1.6 km || 
|-id=525 bgcolor=#fefefe
| 67525 ||  || — || September 1, 2000 || Socorro || LINEAR || NYS || align=right | 2.1 km || 
|-id=526 bgcolor=#fefefe
| 67526 ||  || — || September 2, 2000 || Anderson Mesa || LONEOS || ERI || align=right | 3.5 km || 
|-id=527 bgcolor=#d6d6d6
| 67527 ||  || — || September 2, 2000 || Anderson Mesa || LONEOS || KOR || align=right | 3.2 km || 
|-id=528 bgcolor=#fefefe
| 67528 ||  || — || September 2, 2000 || Anderson Mesa || LONEOS || — || align=right | 1.5 km || 
|-id=529 bgcolor=#fefefe
| 67529 ||  || — || September 3, 2000 || Socorro || LINEAR || — || align=right | 2.0 km || 
|-id=530 bgcolor=#fefefe
| 67530 ||  || — || September 3, 2000 || Socorro || LINEAR || — || align=right | 2.3 km || 
|-id=531 bgcolor=#fefefe
| 67531 ||  || — || September 3, 2000 || Socorro || LINEAR || — || align=right | 3.1 km || 
|-id=532 bgcolor=#fefefe
| 67532 ||  || — || September 4, 2000 || Anderson Mesa || LONEOS || — || align=right | 1.3 km || 
|-id=533 bgcolor=#fefefe
| 67533 ||  || — || September 4, 2000 || Anderson Mesa || LONEOS || V || align=right | 1.8 km || 
|-id=534 bgcolor=#fefefe
| 67534 ||  || — || September 4, 2000 || Anderson Mesa || LONEOS || — || align=right | 1.4 km || 
|-id=535 bgcolor=#fefefe
| 67535 ||  || — || September 5, 2000 || Anderson Mesa || LONEOS || — || align=right | 2.4 km || 
|-id=536 bgcolor=#E9E9E9
| 67536 ||  || — || September 6, 2000 || Socorro || LINEAR || EUN || align=right | 6.5 km || 
|-id=537 bgcolor=#fefefe
| 67537 ||  || — || September 18, 2000 || Socorro || LINEAR || PHO || align=right | 2.6 km || 
|-id=538 bgcolor=#fefefe
| 67538 ||  || — || September 21, 2000 || Haleakala || NEAT || — || align=right | 2.0 km || 
|-id=539 bgcolor=#fefefe
| 67539 ||  || — || September 22, 2000 || Ametlla de Mar || J. Nomen || — || align=right | 1.4 km || 
|-id=540 bgcolor=#fefefe
| 67540 ||  || — || September 24, 2000 || Prescott || P. G. Comba || V || align=right | 1.7 km || 
|-id=541 bgcolor=#fefefe
| 67541 ||  || — || September 23, 2000 || Socorro || LINEAR || — || align=right | 1.7 km || 
|-id=542 bgcolor=#fefefe
| 67542 ||  || — || September 22, 2000 || Anderson Mesa || LONEOS || — || align=right | 1.9 km || 
|-id=543 bgcolor=#fefefe
| 67543 ||  || — || September 24, 2000 || Socorro || LINEAR || — || align=right | 1.2 km || 
|-id=544 bgcolor=#fefefe
| 67544 ||  || — || September 24, 2000 || Socorro || LINEAR || — || align=right | 2.0 km || 
|-id=545 bgcolor=#d6d6d6
| 67545 ||  || — || September 24, 2000 || Socorro || LINEAR || — || align=right | 5.4 km || 
|-id=546 bgcolor=#fefefe
| 67546 ||  || — || September 24, 2000 || Socorro || LINEAR || — || align=right | 1.5 km || 
|-id=547 bgcolor=#E9E9E9
| 67547 ||  || — || September 26, 2000 || Črni Vrh || Črni Vrh || — || align=right | 3.1 km || 
|-id=548 bgcolor=#C2FFFF
| 67548 ||  || — || September 23, 2000 || Socorro || LINEAR || L5 || align=right | 18 km || 
|-id=549 bgcolor=#fefefe
| 67549 ||  || — || September 23, 2000 || Socorro || LINEAR || — || align=right | 1.7 km || 
|-id=550 bgcolor=#fefefe
| 67550 ||  || — || September 24, 2000 || Socorro || LINEAR || — || align=right | 1.2 km || 
|-id=551 bgcolor=#d6d6d6
| 67551 ||  || — || September 24, 2000 || Socorro || LINEAR || BRA || align=right | 3.1 km || 
|-id=552 bgcolor=#fefefe
| 67552 ||  || — || September 24, 2000 || Socorro || LINEAR || — || align=right | 1.3 km || 
|-id=553 bgcolor=#fefefe
| 67553 ||  || — || September 24, 2000 || Socorro || LINEAR || V || align=right | 1.2 km || 
|-id=554 bgcolor=#d6d6d6
| 67554 ||  || — || September 24, 2000 || Socorro || LINEAR || — || align=right | 4.1 km || 
|-id=555 bgcolor=#fefefe
| 67555 ||  || — || September 24, 2000 || Socorro || LINEAR || — || align=right | 3.2 km || 
|-id=556 bgcolor=#d6d6d6
| 67556 ||  || — || September 24, 2000 || Socorro || LINEAR || — || align=right | 6.5 km || 
|-id=557 bgcolor=#fefefe
| 67557 ||  || — || September 24, 2000 || Socorro || LINEAR || FLO || align=right | 2.4 km || 
|-id=558 bgcolor=#fefefe
| 67558 ||  || — || September 24, 2000 || Socorro || LINEAR || — || align=right | 1.4 km || 
|-id=559 bgcolor=#fefefe
| 67559 ||  || — || September 24, 2000 || Socorro || LINEAR || FLO || align=right | 1.1 km || 
|-id=560 bgcolor=#fefefe
| 67560 ||  || — || September 24, 2000 || Socorro || LINEAR || — || align=right | 2.2 km || 
|-id=561 bgcolor=#fefefe
| 67561 ||  || — || September 24, 2000 || Socorro || LINEAR || FLO || align=right | 2.4 km || 
|-id=562 bgcolor=#fefefe
| 67562 ||  || — || September 24, 2000 || Socorro || LINEAR || — || align=right | 1.6 km || 
|-id=563 bgcolor=#E9E9E9
| 67563 ||  || — || September 24, 2000 || Socorro || LINEAR || — || align=right | 2.3 km || 
|-id=564 bgcolor=#fefefe
| 67564 ||  || — || September 24, 2000 || Socorro || LINEAR || V || align=right | 1.9 km || 
|-id=565 bgcolor=#fefefe
| 67565 ||  || — || September 24, 2000 || Socorro || LINEAR || — || align=right | 2.4 km || 
|-id=566 bgcolor=#fefefe
| 67566 ||  || — || September 23, 2000 || Socorro || LINEAR || — || align=right | 2.3 km || 
|-id=567 bgcolor=#fefefe
| 67567 ||  || — || September 23, 2000 || Socorro || LINEAR || V || align=right | 1.7 km || 
|-id=568 bgcolor=#fefefe
| 67568 ||  || — || September 23, 2000 || Socorro || LINEAR || — || align=right | 1.7 km || 
|-id=569 bgcolor=#fefefe
| 67569 ||  || — || September 24, 2000 || Socorro || LINEAR || V || align=right | 1.5 km || 
|-id=570 bgcolor=#fefefe
| 67570 ||  || — || September 24, 2000 || Socorro || LINEAR || FLO || align=right | 2.1 km || 
|-id=571 bgcolor=#fefefe
| 67571 ||  || — || September 24, 2000 || Socorro || LINEAR || — || align=right | 1.1 km || 
|-id=572 bgcolor=#fefefe
| 67572 ||  || — || September 24, 2000 || Socorro || LINEAR || — || align=right | 1.5 km || 
|-id=573 bgcolor=#fefefe
| 67573 ||  || — || September 24, 2000 || Socorro || LINEAR || — || align=right | 1.4 km || 
|-id=574 bgcolor=#fefefe
| 67574 ||  || — || September 24, 2000 || Socorro || LINEAR || FLO || align=right | 2.1 km || 
|-id=575 bgcolor=#d6d6d6
| 67575 ||  || — || September 24, 2000 || Socorro || LINEAR || — || align=right | 8.3 km || 
|-id=576 bgcolor=#fefefe
| 67576 ||  || — || September 24, 2000 || Socorro || LINEAR || — || align=right | 1.4 km || 
|-id=577 bgcolor=#fefefe
| 67577 ||  || — || September 24, 2000 || Socorro || LINEAR || — || align=right | 1.6 km || 
|-id=578 bgcolor=#fefefe
| 67578 ||  || — || September 24, 2000 || Socorro || LINEAR || FLOslow || align=right | 1.9 km || 
|-id=579 bgcolor=#fefefe
| 67579 ||  || — || September 24, 2000 || Socorro || LINEAR || — || align=right | 1.6 km || 
|-id=580 bgcolor=#fefefe
| 67580 ||  || — || September 24, 2000 || Socorro || LINEAR || FLO || align=right | 1.4 km || 
|-id=581 bgcolor=#fefefe
| 67581 ||  || — || September 24, 2000 || Socorro || LINEAR || FLO || align=right | 1.5 km || 
|-id=582 bgcolor=#fefefe
| 67582 ||  || — || September 24, 2000 || Socorro || LINEAR || V || align=right | 2.1 km || 
|-id=583 bgcolor=#fefefe
| 67583 ||  || — || September 24, 2000 || Socorro || LINEAR || — || align=right | 3.1 km || 
|-id=584 bgcolor=#fefefe
| 67584 ||  || — || September 24, 2000 || Socorro || LINEAR || — || align=right | 2.0 km || 
|-id=585 bgcolor=#fefefe
| 67585 ||  || — || September 24, 2000 || Socorro || LINEAR || — || align=right | 1.2 km || 
|-id=586 bgcolor=#fefefe
| 67586 ||  || — || September 24, 2000 || Socorro || LINEAR || SUL || align=right | 5.9 km || 
|-id=587 bgcolor=#fefefe
| 67587 ||  || — || September 24, 2000 || Socorro || LINEAR || — || align=right | 1.9 km || 
|-id=588 bgcolor=#fefefe
| 67588 ||  || — || September 24, 2000 || Socorro || LINEAR || FLO || align=right | 2.0 km || 
|-id=589 bgcolor=#fefefe
| 67589 ||  || — || September 22, 2000 || Socorro || LINEAR || — || align=right | 5.6 km || 
|-id=590 bgcolor=#fefefe
| 67590 ||  || — || September 23, 2000 || Socorro || LINEAR || V || align=right | 1.8 km || 
|-id=591 bgcolor=#fefefe
| 67591 ||  || — || September 23, 2000 || Socorro || LINEAR || — || align=right | 2.4 km || 
|-id=592 bgcolor=#fefefe
| 67592 ||  || — || September 23, 2000 || Socorro || LINEAR || FLO || align=right | 1.2 km || 
|-id=593 bgcolor=#E9E9E9
| 67593 ||  || — || September 23, 2000 || Socorro || LINEAR || ADE || align=right | 3.2 km || 
|-id=594 bgcolor=#fefefe
| 67594 ||  || — || September 23, 2000 || Socorro || LINEAR || V || align=right | 2.3 km || 
|-id=595 bgcolor=#fefefe
| 67595 ||  || — || September 23, 2000 || Socorro || LINEAR || — || align=right | 1.4 km || 
|-id=596 bgcolor=#fefefe
| 67596 ||  || — || September 23, 2000 || Socorro || LINEAR || — || align=right | 2.3 km || 
|-id=597 bgcolor=#fefefe
| 67597 ||  || — || September 23, 2000 || Socorro || LINEAR || FLO || align=right | 2.0 km || 
|-id=598 bgcolor=#fefefe
| 67598 ||  || — || September 23, 2000 || Socorro || LINEAR || — || align=right | 1.9 km || 
|-id=599 bgcolor=#fefefe
| 67599 ||  || — || September 24, 2000 || Socorro || LINEAR || — || align=right | 1.6 km || 
|-id=600 bgcolor=#fefefe
| 67600 ||  || — || September 24, 2000 || Socorro || LINEAR || FLO || align=right | 2.0 km || 
|}

67601–67700 

|-bgcolor=#fefefe
| 67601 ||  || — || September 24, 2000 || Socorro || LINEAR || — || align=right | 1.2 km || 
|-id=602 bgcolor=#fefefe
| 67602 ||  || — || September 24, 2000 || Socorro || LINEAR || FLO || align=right | 3.0 km || 
|-id=603 bgcolor=#fefefe
| 67603 ||  || — || September 24, 2000 || Socorro || LINEAR || — || align=right | 1.5 km || 
|-id=604 bgcolor=#fefefe
| 67604 ||  || — || September 24, 2000 || Socorro || LINEAR || — || align=right | 2.1 km || 
|-id=605 bgcolor=#fefefe
| 67605 ||  || — || September 24, 2000 || Socorro || LINEAR || FLO || align=right | 3.9 km || 
|-id=606 bgcolor=#E9E9E9
| 67606 ||  || — || September 24, 2000 || Socorro || LINEAR || HEN || align=right | 2.8 km || 
|-id=607 bgcolor=#fefefe
| 67607 ||  || — || September 24, 2000 || Socorro || LINEAR || — || align=right | 1.5 km || 
|-id=608 bgcolor=#fefefe
| 67608 ||  || — || September 24, 2000 || Socorro || LINEAR || — || align=right | 3.1 km || 
|-id=609 bgcolor=#fefefe
| 67609 ||  || — || September 24, 2000 || Socorro || LINEAR || — || align=right | 5.8 km || 
|-id=610 bgcolor=#fefefe
| 67610 ||  || — || September 27, 2000 || Socorro || LINEAR || — || align=right | 3.5 km || 
|-id=611 bgcolor=#fefefe
| 67611 ||  || — || September 27, 2000 || Socorro || LINEAR || — || align=right | 3.7 km || 
|-id=612 bgcolor=#fefefe
| 67612 ||  || — || September 27, 2000 || Socorro || LINEAR || FLO || align=right | 2.5 km || 
|-id=613 bgcolor=#fefefe
| 67613 ||  || — || September 21, 2000 || Haleakala || NEAT || — || align=right | 1.4 km || 
|-id=614 bgcolor=#fefefe
| 67614 ||  || — || September 30, 2000 || Elmira || A. J. Cecce || FLO || align=right | 1.4 km || 
|-id=615 bgcolor=#fefefe
| 67615 ||  || — || September 23, 2000 || Socorro || LINEAR || — || align=right | 2.8 km || 
|-id=616 bgcolor=#fefefe
| 67616 ||  || — || September 23, 2000 || Socorro || LINEAR || V || align=right | 2.3 km || 
|-id=617 bgcolor=#fefefe
| 67617 ||  || — || September 23, 2000 || Socorro || LINEAR || — || align=right | 2.5 km || 
|-id=618 bgcolor=#fefefe
| 67618 ||  || — || September 24, 2000 || Socorro || LINEAR || NYS || align=right | 2.0 km || 
|-id=619 bgcolor=#E9E9E9
| 67619 ||  || — || September 24, 2000 || Socorro || LINEAR || MIT || align=right | 6.4 km || 
|-id=620 bgcolor=#fefefe
| 67620 ||  || — || September 28, 2000 || Socorro || LINEAR || V || align=right | 1.7 km || 
|-id=621 bgcolor=#fefefe
| 67621 ||  || — || September 28, 2000 || Socorro || LINEAR || — || align=right | 1.9 km || 
|-id=622 bgcolor=#fefefe
| 67622 ||  || — || September 28, 2000 || Socorro || LINEAR || — || align=right | 2.1 km || 
|-id=623 bgcolor=#fefefe
| 67623 ||  || — || September 28, 2000 || Socorro || LINEAR || — || align=right | 1.9 km || 
|-id=624 bgcolor=#fefefe
| 67624 ||  || — || September 28, 2000 || Socorro || LINEAR || — || align=right | 3.0 km || 
|-id=625 bgcolor=#fefefe
| 67625 ||  || — || September 28, 2000 || Socorro || LINEAR || V || align=right | 2.2 km || 
|-id=626 bgcolor=#fefefe
| 67626 ||  || — || September 28, 2000 || Socorro || LINEAR || — || align=right | 6.0 km || 
|-id=627 bgcolor=#fefefe
| 67627 ||  || — || September 21, 2000 || Haleakala || NEAT || — || align=right | 1.6 km || 
|-id=628 bgcolor=#E9E9E9
| 67628 ||  || — || September 21, 2000 || Haleakala || NEAT || HNS || align=right | 3.9 km || 
|-id=629 bgcolor=#d6d6d6
| 67629 ||  || — || September 24, 2000 || Socorro || LINEAR || — || align=right | 6.6 km || 
|-id=630 bgcolor=#fefefe
| 67630 ||  || — || September 24, 2000 || Socorro || LINEAR || — || align=right | 2.3 km || 
|-id=631 bgcolor=#E9E9E9
| 67631 ||  || — || September 24, 2000 || Socorro || LINEAR || HEN || align=right | 2.6 km || 
|-id=632 bgcolor=#fefefe
| 67632 ||  || — || September 24, 2000 || Socorro || LINEAR || NYS || align=right | 2.0 km || 
|-id=633 bgcolor=#fefefe
| 67633 ||  || — || September 25, 2000 || Socorro || LINEAR || — || align=right | 1.7 km || 
|-id=634 bgcolor=#fefefe
| 67634 ||  || — || September 25, 2000 || Socorro || LINEAR || V || align=right | 1.6 km || 
|-id=635 bgcolor=#fefefe
| 67635 ||  || — || September 25, 2000 || Socorro || LINEAR || — || align=right | 1.3 km || 
|-id=636 bgcolor=#E9E9E9
| 67636 ||  || — || September 25, 2000 || Socorro || LINEAR || GEF || align=right | 3.9 km || 
|-id=637 bgcolor=#fefefe
| 67637 ||  || — || September 25, 2000 || Socorro || LINEAR || FLO || align=right | 1.6 km || 
|-id=638 bgcolor=#fefefe
| 67638 ||  || — || September 26, 2000 || Socorro || LINEAR || NYS || align=right | 2.0 km || 
|-id=639 bgcolor=#fefefe
| 67639 ||  || — || September 26, 2000 || Socorro || LINEAR || — || align=right | 1.8 km || 
|-id=640 bgcolor=#fefefe
| 67640 ||  || — || September 26, 2000 || Socorro || LINEAR || FLO || align=right | 4.7 km || 
|-id=641 bgcolor=#fefefe
| 67641 ||  || — || September 26, 2000 || Socorro || LINEAR || V || align=right | 1.7 km || 
|-id=642 bgcolor=#fefefe
| 67642 ||  || — || September 26, 2000 || Socorro || LINEAR || V || align=right | 1.1 km || 
|-id=643 bgcolor=#fefefe
| 67643 ||  || — || September 26, 2000 || Socorro || LINEAR || FLO || align=right | 2.6 km || 
|-id=644 bgcolor=#fefefe
| 67644 ||  || — || September 26, 2000 || Socorro || LINEAR || — || align=right | 1.9 km || 
|-id=645 bgcolor=#fefefe
| 67645 ||  || — || September 26, 2000 || Socorro || LINEAR || — || align=right | 3.0 km || 
|-id=646 bgcolor=#E9E9E9
| 67646 ||  || — || September 27, 2000 || Socorro || LINEAR || — || align=right | 5.3 km || 
|-id=647 bgcolor=#fefefe
| 67647 ||  || — || September 27, 2000 || Socorro || LINEAR || — || align=right | 2.3 km || 
|-id=648 bgcolor=#fefefe
| 67648 ||  || — || September 27, 2000 || Socorro || LINEAR || FLO || align=right | 1.4 km || 
|-id=649 bgcolor=#E9E9E9
| 67649 ||  || — || September 27, 2000 || Socorro || LINEAR || — || align=right | 3.6 km || 
|-id=650 bgcolor=#fefefe
| 67650 ||  || — || September 28, 2000 || Socorro || LINEAR || FLO || align=right | 1.6 km || 
|-id=651 bgcolor=#fefefe
| 67651 ||  || — || September 30, 2000 || Socorro || LINEAR || — || align=right | 3.7 km || 
|-id=652 bgcolor=#fefefe
| 67652 ||  || — || September 21, 2000 || Socorro || LINEAR || — || align=right | 1.9 km || 
|-id=653 bgcolor=#fefefe
| 67653 ||  || — || September 24, 2000 || Socorro || LINEAR || — || align=right | 1.3 km || 
|-id=654 bgcolor=#fefefe
| 67654 ||  || — || September 24, 2000 || Socorro || LINEAR || FLO || align=right | 1.4 km || 
|-id=655 bgcolor=#fefefe
| 67655 ||  || — || September 26, 2000 || Socorro || LINEAR || — || align=right | 2.2 km || 
|-id=656 bgcolor=#fefefe
| 67656 ||  || — || September 24, 2000 || Socorro || LINEAR || — || align=right | 2.0 km || 
|-id=657 bgcolor=#E9E9E9
| 67657 ||  || — || September 24, 2000 || Socorro || LINEAR || — || align=right | 5.2 km || 
|-id=658 bgcolor=#fefefe
| 67658 ||  || — || September 24, 2000 || Socorro || LINEAR || NYS || align=right | 1.8 km || 
|-id=659 bgcolor=#fefefe
| 67659 ||  || — || September 24, 2000 || Socorro || LINEAR || — || align=right | 1.8 km || 
|-id=660 bgcolor=#d6d6d6
| 67660 ||  || — || September 24, 2000 || Socorro || LINEAR || — || align=right | 4.6 km || 
|-id=661 bgcolor=#fefefe
| 67661 ||  || — || September 24, 2000 || Socorro || LINEAR || — || align=right | 1.9 km || 
|-id=662 bgcolor=#E9E9E9
| 67662 ||  || — || September 27, 2000 || Socorro || LINEAR || — || align=right | 2.7 km || 
|-id=663 bgcolor=#fefefe
| 67663 ||  || — || September 27, 2000 || Socorro || LINEAR || V || align=right | 1.6 km || 
|-id=664 bgcolor=#fefefe
| 67664 ||  || — || September 27, 2000 || Socorro || LINEAR || — || align=right | 1.4 km || 
|-id=665 bgcolor=#fefefe
| 67665 ||  || — || September 27, 2000 || Socorro || LINEAR || V || align=right | 2.8 km || 
|-id=666 bgcolor=#fefefe
| 67666 ||  || — || September 28, 2000 || Socorro || LINEAR || — || align=right | 2.6 km || 
|-id=667 bgcolor=#fefefe
| 67667 ||  || — || September 28, 2000 || Socorro || LINEAR || — || align=right | 1.4 km || 
|-id=668 bgcolor=#fefefe
| 67668 ||  || — || September 28, 2000 || Socorro || LINEAR || — || align=right | 1.6 km || 
|-id=669 bgcolor=#fefefe
| 67669 ||  || — || September 28, 2000 || Socorro || LINEAR || — || align=right | 1.6 km || 
|-id=670 bgcolor=#fefefe
| 67670 ||  || — || September 28, 2000 || Socorro || LINEAR || — || align=right | 1.7 km || 
|-id=671 bgcolor=#fefefe
| 67671 ||  || — || September 28, 2000 || Socorro || LINEAR || V || align=right | 1.5 km || 
|-id=672 bgcolor=#fefefe
| 67672 ||  || — || September 30, 2000 || Socorro || LINEAR || — || align=right | 1.8 km || 
|-id=673 bgcolor=#fefefe
| 67673 ||  || — || September 30, 2000 || Socorro || LINEAR || — || align=right | 2.1 km || 
|-id=674 bgcolor=#fefefe
| 67674 ||  || — || September 30, 2000 || Socorro || LINEAR || V || align=right | 1.3 km || 
|-id=675 bgcolor=#d6d6d6
| 67675 ||  || — || September 28, 2000 || Socorro || LINEAR || — || align=right | 7.2 km || 
|-id=676 bgcolor=#fefefe
| 67676 ||  || — || September 23, 2000 || Socorro || LINEAR || V || align=right | 1.8 km || 
|-id=677 bgcolor=#d6d6d6
| 67677 ||  || — || September 24, 2000 || Socorro || LINEAR || — || align=right | 7.0 km || 
|-id=678 bgcolor=#E9E9E9
| 67678 ||  || — || September 26, 2000 || Socorro || LINEAR || — || align=right | 4.7 km || 
|-id=679 bgcolor=#fefefe
| 67679 ||  || — || September 27, 2000 || Socorro || LINEAR || FLO || align=right | 2.0 km || 
|-id=680 bgcolor=#fefefe
| 67680 ||  || — || September 27, 2000 || Socorro || LINEAR || LCI || align=right | 3.6 km || 
|-id=681 bgcolor=#fefefe
| 67681 ||  || — || September 27, 2000 || Socorro || LINEAR || — || align=right | 4.4 km || 
|-id=682 bgcolor=#fefefe
| 67682 ||  || — || September 27, 2000 || Socorro || LINEAR || — || align=right | 1.9 km || 
|-id=683 bgcolor=#fefefe
| 67683 ||  || — || September 28, 2000 || Socorro || LINEAR || — || align=right | 1.4 km || 
|-id=684 bgcolor=#fefefe
| 67684 ||  || — || September 28, 2000 || Socorro || LINEAR || — || align=right | 1.6 km || 
|-id=685 bgcolor=#fefefe
| 67685 ||  || — || September 28, 2000 || Socorro || LINEAR || V || align=right | 1.6 km || 
|-id=686 bgcolor=#fefefe
| 67686 ||  || — || September 28, 2000 || Socorro || LINEAR || — || align=right | 2.4 km || 
|-id=687 bgcolor=#fefefe
| 67687 ||  || — || September 30, 2000 || Socorro || LINEAR || — || align=right | 1.8 km || 
|-id=688 bgcolor=#fefefe
| 67688 ||  || — || September 30, 2000 || Socorro || LINEAR || — || align=right | 2.0 km || 
|-id=689 bgcolor=#fefefe
| 67689 ||  || — || September 30, 2000 || Socorro || LINEAR || NYS || align=right | 1.8 km || 
|-id=690 bgcolor=#fefefe
| 67690 ||  || — || September 30, 2000 || Socorro || LINEAR || — || align=right | 1.9 km || 
|-id=691 bgcolor=#E9E9E9
| 67691 ||  || — || September 26, 2000 || Socorro || LINEAR || HNS || align=right | 5.3 km || 
|-id=692 bgcolor=#fefefe
| 67692 ||  || — || September 30, 2000 || Socorro || LINEAR || — || align=right | 2.0 km || 
|-id=693 bgcolor=#fefefe
| 67693 ||  || — || September 28, 2000 || Kitt Peak || Spacewatch || NYS || align=right | 1.6 km || 
|-id=694 bgcolor=#d6d6d6
| 67694 ||  || — || September 26, 2000 || Haleakala || NEAT || — || align=right | 6.8 km || 
|-id=695 bgcolor=#fefefe
| 67695 ||  || — || September 26, 2000 || Haleakala || NEAT || — || align=right | 2.1 km || 
|-id=696 bgcolor=#d6d6d6
| 67696 ||  || — || September 20, 2000 || Socorro || LINEAR || — || align=right | 11 km || 
|-id=697 bgcolor=#fefefe
| 67697 ||  || — || September 30, 2000 || Anderson Mesa || LONEOS || — || align=right | 5.0 km || 
|-id=698 bgcolor=#E9E9E9
| 67698 ||  || — || September 29, 2000 || Anderson Mesa || LONEOS || — || align=right | 2.7 km || 
|-id=699 bgcolor=#fefefe
| 67699 ||  || — || September 24, 2000 || Anderson Mesa || LONEOS || FLO || align=right | 1.6 km || 
|-id=700 bgcolor=#E9E9E9
| 67700 ||  || — || October 1, 2000 || Socorro || LINEAR || — || align=right | 1.7 km || 
|}

67701–67800 

|-bgcolor=#fefefe
| 67701 ||  || — || October 1, 2000 || Socorro || LINEAR || — || align=right | 2.0 km || 
|-id=702 bgcolor=#d6d6d6
| 67702 ||  || — || October 1, 2000 || Socorro || LINEAR || THM || align=right | 5.8 km || 
|-id=703 bgcolor=#fefefe
| 67703 ||  || — || October 1, 2000 || Socorro || LINEAR || MAS || align=right | 2.5 km || 
|-id=704 bgcolor=#fefefe
| 67704 ||  || — || October 1, 2000 || Socorro || LINEAR || FLO || align=right | 1.4 km || 
|-id=705 bgcolor=#fefefe
| 67705 ||  || — || October 2, 2000 || Socorro || LINEAR || — || align=right | 2.6 km || 
|-id=706 bgcolor=#E9E9E9
| 67706 ||  || — || October 2, 2000 || Socorro || LINEAR || NEM || align=right | 5.2 km || 
|-id=707 bgcolor=#fefefe
| 67707 ||  || — || October 3, 2000 || Socorro || LINEAR || — || align=right | 2.2 km || 
|-id=708 bgcolor=#fefefe
| 67708 ||  || — || October 6, 2000 || Anderson Mesa || LONEOS || — || align=right | 1.7 km || 
|-id=709 bgcolor=#E9E9E9
| 67709 ||  || — || October 1, 2000 || Socorro || LINEAR || ADE || align=right | 4.9 km || 
|-id=710 bgcolor=#fefefe
| 67710 ||  || — || October 2, 2000 || Socorro || LINEAR || — || align=right | 1.5 km || 
|-id=711 bgcolor=#fefefe
| 67711 || 2000 UB || — || October 18, 2000 || Bisei SG Center || BATTeRS || V || align=right | 2.3 km || 
|-id=712 bgcolor=#fefefe
| 67712 Kimotsuki || 2000 UG ||  || October 21, 2000 || Bisei SG Center || BATTeRS || FLO || align=right | 1.9 km || 
|-id=713 bgcolor=#fefefe
| 67713 ||  || — || October 22, 2000 || Ondřejov || L. Kotková || — || align=right | 2.1 km || 
|-id=714 bgcolor=#fefefe
| 67714 ||  || — || October 22, 2000 || Višnjan Observatory || K. Korlević || — || align=right | 1.5 km || 
|-id=715 bgcolor=#fefefe
| 67715 ||  || — || October 24, 2000 || Socorro || LINEAR || — || align=right | 5.9 km || 
|-id=716 bgcolor=#fefefe
| 67716 ||  || — || October 24, 2000 || Socorro || LINEAR || NYS || align=right | 2.2 km || 
|-id=717 bgcolor=#fefefe
| 67717 ||  || — || October 24, 2000 || Socorro || LINEAR || — || align=right | 2.0 km || 
|-id=718 bgcolor=#fefefe
| 67718 ||  || — || October 24, 2000 || Socorro || LINEAR || FLO || align=right | 1.3 km || 
|-id=719 bgcolor=#fefefe
| 67719 ||  || — || October 25, 2000 || Socorro || LINEAR || — || align=right | 2.3 km || 
|-id=720 bgcolor=#fefefe
| 67720 ||  || — || October 26, 2000 || Bisei SG Center || BATTeRS || FLO || align=right | 2.8 km || 
|-id=721 bgcolor=#fefefe
| 67721 ||  || — || October 25, 2000 || Socorro || LINEAR || — || align=right | 1.4 km || 
|-id=722 bgcolor=#fefefe
| 67722 ||  || — || October 25, 2000 || Socorro || LINEAR || FLO || align=right | 2.3 km || 
|-id=723 bgcolor=#fefefe
| 67723 ||  || — || October 27, 2000 || Kitt Peak || Spacewatch || — || align=right | 1.3 km || 
|-id=724 bgcolor=#fefefe
| 67724 ||  || — || October 29, 2000 || Fountain Hills || C. W. Juels || FLO || align=right | 3.2 km || 
|-id=725 bgcolor=#fefefe
| 67725 ||  || — || October 29, 2000 || Socorro || LINEAR || — || align=right | 3.9 km || 
|-id=726 bgcolor=#fefefe
| 67726 ||  || — || October 24, 2000 || Socorro || LINEAR || — || align=right | 1.5 km || 
|-id=727 bgcolor=#E9E9E9
| 67727 ||  || — || October 24, 2000 || Socorro || LINEAR || — || align=right | 3.8 km || 
|-id=728 bgcolor=#fefefe
| 67728 ||  || — || October 24, 2000 || Socorro || LINEAR || FLO || align=right | 1.9 km || 
|-id=729 bgcolor=#FA8072
| 67729 ||  || — || October 24, 2000 || Socorro || LINEAR || — || align=right | 1.2 km || 
|-id=730 bgcolor=#fefefe
| 67730 ||  || — || October 24, 2000 || Socorro || LINEAR || — || align=right | 2.3 km || 
|-id=731 bgcolor=#fefefe
| 67731 ||  || — || October 24, 2000 || Socorro || LINEAR || — || align=right | 1.3 km || 
|-id=732 bgcolor=#fefefe
| 67732 ||  || — || October 24, 2000 || Socorro || LINEAR || V || align=right | 1.6 km || 
|-id=733 bgcolor=#fefefe
| 67733 ||  || — || October 24, 2000 || Socorro || LINEAR || — || align=right | 1.8 km || 
|-id=734 bgcolor=#fefefe
| 67734 ||  || — || October 24, 2000 || Socorro || LINEAR || — || align=right | 2.9 km || 
|-id=735 bgcolor=#fefefe
| 67735 ||  || — || October 24, 2000 || Socorro || LINEAR || — || align=right | 1.9 km || 
|-id=736 bgcolor=#fefefe
| 67736 ||  || — || October 25, 2000 || Socorro || LINEAR || — || align=right | 1.6 km || 
|-id=737 bgcolor=#fefefe
| 67737 ||  || — || October 25, 2000 || Socorro || LINEAR || V || align=right | 1.6 km || 
|-id=738 bgcolor=#fefefe
| 67738 ||  || — || October 29, 2000 || Kitt Peak || Spacewatch || — || align=right | 1.5 km || 
|-id=739 bgcolor=#fefefe
| 67739 ||  || — || October 25, 2000 || Socorro || LINEAR || — || align=right | 1.5 km || 
|-id=740 bgcolor=#fefefe
| 67740 ||  || — || October 29, 2000 || Kitt Peak || Spacewatch || — || align=right | 1.3 km || 
|-id=741 bgcolor=#fefefe
| 67741 ||  || — || October 30, 2000 || Desert Beaver || W. K. Y. Yeung || — || align=right | 1.8 km || 
|-id=742 bgcolor=#fefefe
| 67742 ||  || — || October 24, 2000 || Socorro || LINEAR || FLO || align=right | 1.6 km || 
|-id=743 bgcolor=#fefefe
| 67743 ||  || — || October 24, 2000 || Socorro || LINEAR || — || align=right | 4.3 km || 
|-id=744 bgcolor=#fefefe
| 67744 ||  || — || October 24, 2000 || Socorro || LINEAR || — || align=right | 4.5 km || 
|-id=745 bgcolor=#E9E9E9
| 67745 ||  || — || October 24, 2000 || Socorro || LINEAR || — || align=right | 2.3 km || 
|-id=746 bgcolor=#fefefe
| 67746 ||  || — || October 24, 2000 || Socorro || LINEAR || FLO || align=right | 1.8 km || 
|-id=747 bgcolor=#fefefe
| 67747 ||  || — || October 24, 2000 || Socorro || LINEAR || — || align=right | 2.3 km || 
|-id=748 bgcolor=#fefefe
| 67748 ||  || — || October 24, 2000 || Socorro || LINEAR || V || align=right | 1.2 km || 
|-id=749 bgcolor=#fefefe
| 67749 ||  || — || October 24, 2000 || Socorro || LINEAR || V || align=right | 2.0 km || 
|-id=750 bgcolor=#fefefe
| 67750 ||  || — || October 24, 2000 || Socorro || LINEAR || — || align=right | 2.7 km || 
|-id=751 bgcolor=#E9E9E9
| 67751 ||  || — || October 24, 2000 || Socorro || LINEAR || — || align=right | 4.6 km || 
|-id=752 bgcolor=#E9E9E9
| 67752 ||  || — || October 24, 2000 || Socorro || LINEAR || — || align=right | 5.8 km || 
|-id=753 bgcolor=#fefefe
| 67753 ||  || — || October 24, 2000 || Socorro || LINEAR || — || align=right | 2.2 km || 
|-id=754 bgcolor=#fefefe
| 67754 ||  || — || October 24, 2000 || Socorro || LINEAR || V || align=right | 1.7 km || 
|-id=755 bgcolor=#fefefe
| 67755 ||  || — || October 24, 2000 || Socorro || LINEAR || — || align=right | 2.2 km || 
|-id=756 bgcolor=#fefefe
| 67756 ||  || — || October 24, 2000 || Socorro || LINEAR || V || align=right | 2.2 km || 
|-id=757 bgcolor=#fefefe
| 67757 ||  || — || October 24, 2000 || Socorro || LINEAR || V || align=right | 1.2 km || 
|-id=758 bgcolor=#fefefe
| 67758 ||  || — || October 24, 2000 || Socorro || LINEAR || — || align=right | 2.1 km || 
|-id=759 bgcolor=#fefefe
| 67759 ||  || — || October 24, 2000 || Socorro || LINEAR || FLO || align=right | 1.5 km || 
|-id=760 bgcolor=#fefefe
| 67760 ||  || — || October 25, 2000 || Socorro || LINEAR || — || align=right | 2.1 km || 
|-id=761 bgcolor=#fefefe
| 67761 ||  || — || October 25, 2000 || Socorro || LINEAR || — || align=right | 2.2 km || 
|-id=762 bgcolor=#fefefe
| 67762 ||  || — || October 25, 2000 || Socorro || LINEAR || — || align=right | 2.5 km || 
|-id=763 bgcolor=#fefefe
| 67763 ||  || — || October 25, 2000 || Socorro || LINEAR || V || align=right | 1.6 km || 
|-id=764 bgcolor=#fefefe
| 67764 ||  || — || October 25, 2000 || Socorro || LINEAR || — || align=right | 1.8 km || 
|-id=765 bgcolor=#fefefe
| 67765 ||  || — || October 25, 2000 || Socorro || LINEAR || FLO || align=right | 1.7 km || 
|-id=766 bgcolor=#fefefe
| 67766 ||  || — || October 25, 2000 || Socorro || LINEAR || V || align=right | 1.6 km || 
|-id=767 bgcolor=#fefefe
| 67767 ||  || — || October 25, 2000 || Socorro || LINEAR || — || align=right | 3.8 km || 
|-id=768 bgcolor=#fefefe
| 67768 ||  || — || October 25, 2000 || Socorro || LINEAR || FLO || align=right | 1.4 km || 
|-id=769 bgcolor=#fefefe
| 67769 ||  || — || October 25, 2000 || Socorro || LINEAR || FLO || align=right | 1.7 km || 
|-id=770 bgcolor=#fefefe
| 67770 ||  || — || October 25, 2000 || Socorro || LINEAR || FLO || align=right | 2.3 km || 
|-id=771 bgcolor=#fefefe
| 67771 ||  || — || October 29, 2000 || Socorro || LINEAR || — || align=right | 4.1 km || 
|-id=772 bgcolor=#fefefe
| 67772 ||  || — || October 24, 2000 || Socorro || LINEAR || V || align=right | 1.5 km || 
|-id=773 bgcolor=#E9E9E9
| 67773 ||  || — || October 24, 2000 || Socorro || LINEAR || EUN || align=right | 3.8 km || 
|-id=774 bgcolor=#fefefe
| 67774 ||  || — || October 24, 2000 || Socorro || LINEAR || — || align=right | 1.6 km || 
|-id=775 bgcolor=#fefefe
| 67775 ||  || — || October 24, 2000 || Socorro || LINEAR || — || align=right | 2.3 km || 
|-id=776 bgcolor=#fefefe
| 67776 ||  || — || October 24, 2000 || Socorro || LINEAR || — || align=right | 3.1 km || 
|-id=777 bgcolor=#fefefe
| 67777 ||  || — || October 24, 2000 || Socorro || LINEAR || — || align=right | 1.8 km || 
|-id=778 bgcolor=#fefefe
| 67778 ||  || — || October 24, 2000 || Socorro || LINEAR || FLO || align=right | 2.0 km || 
|-id=779 bgcolor=#E9E9E9
| 67779 ||  || — || October 24, 2000 || Socorro || LINEAR || PAL || align=right | 11 km || 
|-id=780 bgcolor=#E9E9E9
| 67780 ||  || — || October 31, 2000 || Socorro || LINEAR || — || align=right | 1.9 km || 
|-id=781 bgcolor=#fefefe
| 67781 ||  || — || October 31, 2000 || Socorro || LINEAR || MAS || align=right | 2.4 km || 
|-id=782 bgcolor=#fefefe
| 67782 ||  || — || October 31, 2000 || Socorro || LINEAR || — || align=right | 2.0 km || 
|-id=783 bgcolor=#fefefe
| 67783 ||  || — || October 31, 2000 || Socorro || LINEAR || — || align=right | 1.1 km || 
|-id=784 bgcolor=#fefefe
| 67784 ||  || — || October 31, 2000 || Socorro || LINEAR || V || align=right | 1.4 km || 
|-id=785 bgcolor=#fefefe
| 67785 ||  || — || October 25, 2000 || Socorro || LINEAR || FLO || align=right | 4.6 km || 
|-id=786 bgcolor=#fefefe
| 67786 ||  || — || October 25, 2000 || Socorro || LINEAR || — || align=right | 1.5 km || 
|-id=787 bgcolor=#fefefe
| 67787 ||  || — || October 25, 2000 || Socorro || LINEAR || — || align=right | 1.8 km || 
|-id=788 bgcolor=#fefefe
| 67788 ||  || — || October 25, 2000 || Socorro || LINEAR || V || align=right | 2.0 km || 
|-id=789 bgcolor=#fefefe
| 67789 ||  || — || October 25, 2000 || Socorro || LINEAR || FLO || align=right | 2.2 km || 
|-id=790 bgcolor=#fefefe
| 67790 ||  || — || October 25, 2000 || Socorro || LINEAR || FLO || align=right | 2.0 km || 
|-id=791 bgcolor=#fefefe
| 67791 ||  || — || October 25, 2000 || Socorro || LINEAR || FLO || align=right | 2.7 km || 
|-id=792 bgcolor=#fefefe
| 67792 ||  || — || October 25, 2000 || Socorro || LINEAR || — || align=right | 1.7 km || 
|-id=793 bgcolor=#fefefe
| 67793 ||  || — || October 25, 2000 || Socorro || LINEAR || FLO || align=right | 1.7 km || 
|-id=794 bgcolor=#fefefe
| 67794 ||  || — || October 25, 2000 || Socorro || LINEAR || V || align=right | 3.2 km || 
|-id=795 bgcolor=#E9E9E9
| 67795 ||  || — || October 25, 2000 || Socorro || LINEAR || EUN || align=right | 3.9 km || 
|-id=796 bgcolor=#E9E9E9
| 67796 ||  || — || October 25, 2000 || Socorro || LINEAR || — || align=right | 5.9 km || 
|-id=797 bgcolor=#fefefe
| 67797 ||  || — || October 30, 2000 || Socorro || LINEAR || — || align=right | 2.1 km || 
|-id=798 bgcolor=#fefefe
| 67798 ||  || — || October 31, 2000 || Socorro || LINEAR || V || align=right | 1.4 km || 
|-id=799 bgcolor=#d6d6d6
| 67799 ||  || — || October 31, 2000 || Socorro || LINEAR || EOS || align=right | 4.7 km || 
|-id=800 bgcolor=#fefefe
| 67800 ||  || — || October 31, 2000 || Socorro || LINEAR || ERI || align=right | 3.7 km || 
|}

67801–67900 

|-bgcolor=#fefefe
| 67801 ||  || — || October 31, 2000 || Socorro || LINEAR || — || align=right | 3.7 km || 
|-id=802 bgcolor=#fefefe
| 67802 ||  || — || November 1, 2000 || Socorro || LINEAR || — || align=right | 2.3 km || 
|-id=803 bgcolor=#fefefe
| 67803 ||  || — || November 1, 2000 || Socorro || LINEAR || NYS || align=right | 3.3 km || 
|-id=804 bgcolor=#d6d6d6
| 67804 ||  || — || November 1, 2000 || Socorro || LINEAR || — || align=right | 4.3 km || 
|-id=805 bgcolor=#fefefe
| 67805 ||  || — || November 1, 2000 || Socorro || LINEAR || FLO || align=right | 1.7 km || 
|-id=806 bgcolor=#E9E9E9
| 67806 ||  || — || November 1, 2000 || Socorro || LINEAR || — || align=right | 2.9 km || 
|-id=807 bgcolor=#fefefe
| 67807 ||  || — || November 1, 2000 || Socorro || LINEAR || — || align=right | 4.7 km || 
|-id=808 bgcolor=#fefefe
| 67808 ||  || — || November 1, 2000 || Socorro || LINEAR || — || align=right | 1.3 km || 
|-id=809 bgcolor=#E9E9E9
| 67809 ||  || — || November 1, 2000 || Socorro || LINEAR || EUN || align=right | 2.5 km || 
|-id=810 bgcolor=#fefefe
| 67810 ||  || — || November 1, 2000 || Socorro || LINEAR || — || align=right | 2.8 km || 
|-id=811 bgcolor=#d6d6d6
| 67811 ||  || — || November 1, 2000 || Socorro || LINEAR || KOR || align=right | 3.4 km || 
|-id=812 bgcolor=#fefefe
| 67812 ||  || — || November 1, 2000 || Socorro || LINEAR || — || align=right | 1.7 km || 
|-id=813 bgcolor=#fefefe
| 67813 ||  || — || November 1, 2000 || Socorro || LINEAR || — || align=right | 1.5 km || 
|-id=814 bgcolor=#fefefe
| 67814 ||  || — || November 1, 2000 || Socorro || LINEAR || V || align=right | 1.5 km || 
|-id=815 bgcolor=#fefefe
| 67815 ||  || — || November 1, 2000 || Socorro || LINEAR || — || align=right | 1.5 km || 
|-id=816 bgcolor=#fefefe
| 67816 ||  || — || November 1, 2000 || Socorro || LINEAR || V || align=right | 1.7 km || 
|-id=817 bgcolor=#d6d6d6
| 67817 ||  || — || November 1, 2000 || Socorro || LINEAR || HYG || align=right | 10 km || 
|-id=818 bgcolor=#fefefe
| 67818 ||  || — || November 1, 2000 || Socorro || LINEAR || — || align=right | 4.9 km || 
|-id=819 bgcolor=#fefefe
| 67819 ||  || — || November 1, 2000 || Socorro || LINEAR || FLO || align=right | 2.2 km || 
|-id=820 bgcolor=#fefefe
| 67820 ||  || — || November 1, 2000 || Socorro || LINEAR || — || align=right | 1.9 km || 
|-id=821 bgcolor=#fefefe
| 67821 ||  || — || November 1, 2000 || Socorro || LINEAR || — || align=right | 1.8 km || 
|-id=822 bgcolor=#fefefe
| 67822 ||  || — || November 1, 2000 || Socorro || LINEAR || — || align=right | 1.9 km || 
|-id=823 bgcolor=#fefefe
| 67823 ||  || — || November 1, 2000 || Socorro || LINEAR || NYS || align=right | 2.1 km || 
|-id=824 bgcolor=#fefefe
| 67824 ||  || — || November 1, 2000 || Desert Beaver || W. K. Y. Yeung || — || align=right | 2.1 km || 
|-id=825 bgcolor=#fefefe
| 67825 ||  || — || November 1, 2000 || Socorro || LINEAR || — || align=right | 1.9 km || 
|-id=826 bgcolor=#fefefe
| 67826 ||  || — || November 2, 2000 || Socorro || LINEAR || V || align=right | 1.6 km || 
|-id=827 bgcolor=#fefefe
| 67827 ||  || — || November 3, 2000 || Socorro || LINEAR || — || align=right | 2.1 km || 
|-id=828 bgcolor=#fefefe
| 67828 ||  || — || November 3, 2000 || Socorro || LINEAR || — || align=right | 2.3 km || 
|-id=829 bgcolor=#fefefe
| 67829 ||  || — || November 2, 2000 || Socorro || LINEAR || — || align=right | 2.0 km || 
|-id=830 bgcolor=#fefefe
| 67830 ||  || — || November 2, 2000 || Socorro || LINEAR || FLO || align=right | 1.2 km || 
|-id=831 bgcolor=#fefefe
| 67831 ||  || — || November 2, 2000 || Socorro || LINEAR || — || align=right | 5.0 km || 
|-id=832 bgcolor=#fefefe
| 67832 ||  || — || November 3, 2000 || Socorro || LINEAR || FLO || align=right | 2.1 km || 
|-id=833 bgcolor=#fefefe
| 67833 ||  || — || November 3, 2000 || Socorro || LINEAR || — || align=right | 2.3 km || 
|-id=834 bgcolor=#d6d6d6
| 67834 ||  || — || November 3, 2000 || Socorro || LINEAR || EUP || align=right | 12 km || 
|-id=835 bgcolor=#fefefe
| 67835 ||  || — || November 3, 2000 || Socorro || LINEAR || — || align=right | 3.3 km || 
|-id=836 bgcolor=#fefefe
| 67836 ||  || — || November 3, 2000 || Socorro || LINEAR || FLO || align=right | 1.5 km || 
|-id=837 bgcolor=#fefefe
| 67837 ||  || — || November 3, 2000 || Socorro || LINEAR || FLO || align=right | 1.7 km || 
|-id=838 bgcolor=#fefefe
| 67838 ||  || — || November 3, 2000 || Socorro || LINEAR || — || align=right | 2.2 km || 
|-id=839 bgcolor=#fefefe
| 67839 ||  || — || November 3, 2000 || Socorro || LINEAR || — || align=right | 2.7 km || 
|-id=840 bgcolor=#fefefe
| 67840 ||  || — || November 2, 2000 || Socorro || LINEAR || — || align=right | 2.1 km || 
|-id=841 bgcolor=#E9E9E9
| 67841 ||  || — || November 9, 2000 || Socorro || LINEAR || BAR || align=right | 3.6 km || 
|-id=842 bgcolor=#fefefe
| 67842 ||  || — || November 9, 2000 || Socorro || LINEAR || PHO || align=right | 2.7 km || 
|-id=843 bgcolor=#fefefe
| 67843 || 2000 WL || — || November 16, 2000 || Socorro || LINEAR || — || align=right | 2.4 km || 
|-id=844 bgcolor=#fefefe
| 67844 ||  || — || November 19, 2000 || Socorro || LINEAR || V || align=right | 1.3 km || 
|-id=845 bgcolor=#fefefe
| 67845 ||  || — || November 19, 2000 || Socorro || LINEAR || — || align=right | 1.9 km || 
|-id=846 bgcolor=#fefefe
| 67846 ||  || — || November 19, 2000 || Socorro || LINEAR || — || align=right | 1.7 km || 
|-id=847 bgcolor=#fefefe
| 67847 ||  || — || November 19, 2000 || Socorro || LINEAR || V || align=right | 1.5 km || 
|-id=848 bgcolor=#E9E9E9
| 67848 ||  || — || November 19, 2000 || Socorro || LINEAR || EUN || align=right | 3.5 km || 
|-id=849 bgcolor=#fefefe
| 67849 ||  || — || November 20, 2000 || Socorro || LINEAR || — || align=right | 1.6 km || 
|-id=850 bgcolor=#fefefe
| 67850 ||  || — || November 20, 2000 || Socorro || LINEAR || — || align=right | 2.7 km || 
|-id=851 bgcolor=#fefefe
| 67851 ||  || — || November 20, 2000 || Socorro || LINEAR || FLO || align=right | 2.0 km || 
|-id=852 bgcolor=#fefefe
| 67852 ||  || — || November 20, 2000 || Socorro || LINEAR || — || align=right | 1.9 km || 
|-id=853 bgcolor=#fefefe
| 67853 Iwamura ||  ||  || November 22, 2000 || Kuma Kogen || A. Nakamura || FLO || align=right | 1.6 km || 
|-id=854 bgcolor=#E9E9E9
| 67854 ||  || — || November 24, 2000 || Kitt Peak || Spacewatch || JUN || align=right | 2.7 km || 
|-id=855 bgcolor=#E9E9E9
| 67855 ||  || — || November 18, 2000 || Socorro || LINEAR || — || align=right | 4.2 km || 
|-id=856 bgcolor=#fefefe
| 67856 ||  || — || November 20, 2000 || Socorro || LINEAR || — || align=right | 3.1 km || 
|-id=857 bgcolor=#E9E9E9
| 67857 ||  || — || November 21, 2000 || Socorro || LINEAR || — || align=right | 5.1 km || 
|-id=858 bgcolor=#E9E9E9
| 67858 ||  || — || November 25, 2000 || Kitt Peak || Spacewatch || — || align=right | 2.3 km || 
|-id=859 bgcolor=#fefefe
| 67859 ||  || — || November 20, 2000 || Socorro || LINEAR || — || align=right | 2.2 km || 
|-id=860 bgcolor=#E9E9E9
| 67860 ||  || — || November 20, 2000 || Socorro || LINEAR || — || align=right | 3.7 km || 
|-id=861 bgcolor=#fefefe
| 67861 ||  || — || November 20, 2000 || Socorro || LINEAR || FLO || align=right | 1.5 km || 
|-id=862 bgcolor=#fefefe
| 67862 ||  || — || November 20, 2000 || Socorro || LINEAR || V || align=right | 1.7 km || 
|-id=863 bgcolor=#fefefe
| 67863 ||  || — || November 20, 2000 || Socorro || LINEAR || V || align=right | 1.6 km || 
|-id=864 bgcolor=#fefefe
| 67864 ||  || — || November 20, 2000 || Socorro || LINEAR || V || align=right | 1.7 km || 
|-id=865 bgcolor=#FA8072
| 67865 ||  || — || November 20, 2000 || Socorro || LINEAR || — || align=right | 1.9 km || 
|-id=866 bgcolor=#fefefe
| 67866 ||  || — || November 20, 2000 || Socorro || LINEAR || V || align=right | 2.2 km || 
|-id=867 bgcolor=#fefefe
| 67867 ||  || — || November 20, 2000 || Socorro || LINEAR || — || align=right | 2.2 km || 
|-id=868 bgcolor=#fefefe
| 67868 ||  || — || November 20, 2000 || Socorro || LINEAR || V || align=right | 1.3 km || 
|-id=869 bgcolor=#fefefe
| 67869 ||  || — || November 20, 2000 || Socorro || LINEAR || V || align=right | 1.6 km || 
|-id=870 bgcolor=#fefefe
| 67870 ||  || — || November 20, 2000 || Socorro || LINEAR || V || align=right | 1.6 km || 
|-id=871 bgcolor=#fefefe
| 67871 ||  || — || November 20, 2000 || Socorro || LINEAR || FLO || align=right | 1.4 km || 
|-id=872 bgcolor=#fefefe
| 67872 ||  || — || November 20, 2000 || Socorro || LINEAR || V || align=right | 1.6 km || 
|-id=873 bgcolor=#fefefe
| 67873 ||  || — || November 20, 2000 || Socorro || LINEAR || FLO || align=right | 1.7 km || 
|-id=874 bgcolor=#fefefe
| 67874 ||  || — || November 20, 2000 || Socorro || LINEAR || V || align=right | 1.4 km || 
|-id=875 bgcolor=#fefefe
| 67875 ||  || — || November 20, 2000 || Socorro || LINEAR || V || align=right | 2.6 km || 
|-id=876 bgcolor=#fefefe
| 67876 ||  || — || November 20, 2000 || Socorro || LINEAR || — || align=right | 2.5 km || 
|-id=877 bgcolor=#fefefe
| 67877 ||  || — || November 20, 2000 || Socorro || LINEAR || — || align=right | 2.4 km || 
|-id=878 bgcolor=#fefefe
| 67878 ||  || — || November 20, 2000 || Socorro || LINEAR || — || align=right | 2.4 km || 
|-id=879 bgcolor=#fefefe
| 67879 ||  || — || November 21, 2000 || Socorro || LINEAR || — || align=right | 1.8 km || 
|-id=880 bgcolor=#fefefe
| 67880 ||  || — || November 21, 2000 || Socorro || LINEAR || V || align=right | 1.4 km || 
|-id=881 bgcolor=#fefefe
| 67881 ||  || — || November 21, 2000 || Socorro || LINEAR || V || align=right | 1.1 km || 
|-id=882 bgcolor=#fefefe
| 67882 ||  || — || November 21, 2000 || Socorro || LINEAR || — || align=right | 2.0 km || 
|-id=883 bgcolor=#fefefe
| 67883 ||  || — || November 25, 2000 || Socorro || LINEAR || — || align=right | 2.8 km || 
|-id=884 bgcolor=#fefefe
| 67884 ||  || — || November 26, 2000 || Socorro || LINEAR || — || align=right | 2.1 km || 
|-id=885 bgcolor=#fefefe
| 67885 ||  || — || November 28, 2000 || Višnjan Observatory || K. Korlević || FLO || align=right | 1.6 km || 
|-id=886 bgcolor=#fefefe
| 67886 ||  || — || November 21, 2000 || Socorro || LINEAR || — || align=right | 2.8 km || 
|-id=887 bgcolor=#d6d6d6
| 67887 ||  || — || November 21, 2000 || Socorro || LINEAR || INA || align=right | 7.2 km || 
|-id=888 bgcolor=#fefefe
| 67888 ||  || — || November 21, 2000 || Socorro || LINEAR || — || align=right | 2.2 km || 
|-id=889 bgcolor=#fefefe
| 67889 ||  || — || November 21, 2000 || Socorro || LINEAR || — || align=right | 2.0 km || 
|-id=890 bgcolor=#E9E9E9
| 67890 ||  || — || November 21, 2000 || Socorro || LINEAR || — || align=right | 3.8 km || 
|-id=891 bgcolor=#fefefe
| 67891 ||  || — || November 21, 2000 || Socorro || LINEAR || ERI || align=right | 5.1 km || 
|-id=892 bgcolor=#fefefe
| 67892 ||  || — || November 21, 2000 || Socorro || LINEAR || NYS || align=right | 1.9 km || 
|-id=893 bgcolor=#fefefe
| 67893 ||  || — || November 21, 2000 || Socorro || LINEAR || — || align=right | 2.8 km || 
|-id=894 bgcolor=#fefefe
| 67894 ||  || — || November 19, 2000 || Socorro || LINEAR || — || align=right | 2.4 km || 
|-id=895 bgcolor=#fefefe
| 67895 ||  || — || November 19, 2000 || Socorro || LINEAR || V || align=right | 2.2 km || 
|-id=896 bgcolor=#fefefe
| 67896 ||  || — || November 20, 2000 || Socorro || LINEAR || — || align=right | 4.2 km || 
|-id=897 bgcolor=#fefefe
| 67897 ||  || — || November 20, 2000 || Socorro || LINEAR || V || align=right | 2.1 km || 
|-id=898 bgcolor=#d6d6d6
| 67898 ||  || — || November 20, 2000 || Socorro || LINEAR || — || align=right | 11 km || 
|-id=899 bgcolor=#E9E9E9
| 67899 ||  || — || November 20, 2000 || Socorro || LINEAR || — || align=right | 4.4 km || 
|-id=900 bgcolor=#fefefe
| 67900 ||  || — || November 21, 2000 || Socorro || LINEAR || — || align=right | 1.9 km || 
|}

67901–68000 

|-bgcolor=#fefefe
| 67901 ||  || — || November 21, 2000 || Socorro || LINEAR || FLO || align=right | 1.3 km || 
|-id=902 bgcolor=#fefefe
| 67902 ||  || — || November 21, 2000 || Socorro || LINEAR || V || align=right | 1.6 km || 
|-id=903 bgcolor=#d6d6d6
| 67903 ||  || — || November 21, 2000 || Socorro || LINEAR || EOS || align=right | 5.9 km || 
|-id=904 bgcolor=#fefefe
| 67904 ||  || — || November 21, 2000 || Socorro || LINEAR || — || align=right | 3.3 km || 
|-id=905 bgcolor=#fefefe
| 67905 ||  || — || November 21, 2000 || Socorro || LINEAR || — || align=right | 1.9 km || 
|-id=906 bgcolor=#fefefe
| 67906 ||  || — || November 21, 2000 || Socorro || LINEAR || NYS || align=right | 2.0 km || 
|-id=907 bgcolor=#fefefe
| 67907 ||  || — || November 21, 2000 || Socorro || LINEAR || MAS || align=right | 2.0 km || 
|-id=908 bgcolor=#fefefe
| 67908 ||  || — || November 21, 2000 || Socorro || LINEAR || V || align=right | 2.5 km || 
|-id=909 bgcolor=#fefefe
| 67909 ||  || — || November 21, 2000 || Socorro || LINEAR || V || align=right | 2.8 km || 
|-id=910 bgcolor=#fefefe
| 67910 ||  || — || November 21, 2000 || Socorro || LINEAR || — || align=right | 1.8 km || 
|-id=911 bgcolor=#fefefe
| 67911 ||  || — || November 21, 2000 || Socorro || LINEAR || NYS || align=right | 1.6 km || 
|-id=912 bgcolor=#E9E9E9
| 67912 ||  || — || November 21, 2000 || Socorro || LINEAR || EUN || align=right | 3.8 km || 
|-id=913 bgcolor=#fefefe
| 67913 ||  || — || November 26, 2000 || Socorro || LINEAR || — || align=right | 1.6 km || 
|-id=914 bgcolor=#fefefe
| 67914 ||  || — || November 27, 2000 || Socorro || LINEAR || ERI || align=right | 4.7 km || 
|-id=915 bgcolor=#fefefe
| 67915 ||  || — || November 26, 2000 || Kitt Peak || Spacewatch || MAS || align=right | 1.7 km || 
|-id=916 bgcolor=#d6d6d6
| 67916 ||  || — || November 28, 2000 || Kitt Peak || Spacewatch || HYG || align=right | 6.4 km || 
|-id=917 bgcolor=#E9E9E9
| 67917 ||  || — || November 20, 2000 || Socorro || LINEAR || — || align=right | 2.4 km || 
|-id=918 bgcolor=#fefefe
| 67918 ||  || — || November 20, 2000 || Socorro || LINEAR || ERI || align=right | 5.4 km || 
|-id=919 bgcolor=#fefefe
| 67919 ||  || — || November 20, 2000 || Socorro || LINEAR || — || align=right | 2.7 km || 
|-id=920 bgcolor=#E9E9E9
| 67920 ||  || — || November 20, 2000 || Socorro || LINEAR || EUN || align=right | 3.8 km || 
|-id=921 bgcolor=#E9E9E9
| 67921 ||  || — || November 20, 2000 || Socorro || LINEAR || EUN || align=right | 3.0 km || 
|-id=922 bgcolor=#fefefe
| 67922 ||  || — || November 20, 2000 || Socorro || LINEAR || — || align=right | 2.1 km || 
|-id=923 bgcolor=#fefefe
| 67923 ||  || — || November 20, 2000 || Socorro || LINEAR || V || align=right | 1.9 km || 
|-id=924 bgcolor=#fefefe
| 67924 ||  || — || November 20, 2000 || Socorro || LINEAR || — || align=right | 1.9 km || 
|-id=925 bgcolor=#fefefe
| 67925 ||  || — || November 20, 2000 || Socorro || LINEAR || FLO || align=right | 2.4 km || 
|-id=926 bgcolor=#fefefe
| 67926 ||  || — || November 20, 2000 || Socorro || LINEAR || V || align=right | 2.2 km || 
|-id=927 bgcolor=#fefefe
| 67927 ||  || — || November 20, 2000 || Socorro || LINEAR || — || align=right | 2.1 km || 
|-id=928 bgcolor=#fefefe
| 67928 ||  || — || November 29, 2000 || Socorro || LINEAR || — || align=right | 3.1 km || 
|-id=929 bgcolor=#fefefe
| 67929 ||  || — || November 29, 2000 || Socorro || LINEAR || — || align=right | 2.3 km || 
|-id=930 bgcolor=#fefefe
| 67930 ||  || — || November 29, 2000 || Socorro || LINEAR || — || align=right | 2.1 km || 
|-id=931 bgcolor=#fefefe
| 67931 ||  || — || November 29, 2000 || Socorro || LINEAR || FLO || align=right | 1.8 km || 
|-id=932 bgcolor=#d6d6d6
| 67932 ||  || — || November 30, 2000 || Socorro || LINEAR || — || align=right | 9.7 km || 
|-id=933 bgcolor=#fefefe
| 67933 ||  || — || November 17, 2000 || Kitt Peak || Spacewatch || — || align=right | 3.3 km || 
|-id=934 bgcolor=#E9E9E9
| 67934 ||  || — || November 19, 2000 || Socorro || LINEAR || EUN || align=right | 3.7 km || 
|-id=935 bgcolor=#fefefe
| 67935 ||  || — || November 19, 2000 || Socorro || LINEAR || V || align=right | 1.9 km || 
|-id=936 bgcolor=#fefefe
| 67936 ||  || — || November 19, 2000 || Socorro || LINEAR || — || align=right | 2.4 km || 
|-id=937 bgcolor=#fefefe
| 67937 ||  || — || November 20, 2000 || Socorro || LINEAR || NYS || align=right | 1.6 km || 
|-id=938 bgcolor=#fefefe
| 67938 ||  || — || November 20, 2000 || Socorro || LINEAR || NYS || align=right | 1.9 km || 
|-id=939 bgcolor=#fefefe
| 67939 ||  || — || November 20, 2000 || Anderson Mesa || LONEOS || — || align=right | 2.5 km || 
|-id=940 bgcolor=#fefefe
| 67940 ||  || — || November 20, 2000 || Socorro || LINEAR || ERI || align=right | 5.6 km || 
|-id=941 bgcolor=#fefefe
| 67941 ||  || — || November 20, 2000 || Socorro || LINEAR || — || align=right | 2.0 km || 
|-id=942 bgcolor=#fefefe
| 67942 ||  || — || November 21, 2000 || Socorro || LINEAR || — || align=right | 1.8 km || 
|-id=943 bgcolor=#FA8072
| 67943 ||  || — || November 30, 2000 || Socorro || LINEAR || — || align=right | 1.6 km || 
|-id=944 bgcolor=#fefefe
| 67944 ||  || — || November 30, 2000 || Haleakala || NEAT || — || align=right | 2.9 km || 
|-id=945 bgcolor=#fefefe
| 67945 ||  || — || November 29, 2000 || Socorro || LINEAR || FLO || align=right | 1.8 km || 
|-id=946 bgcolor=#fefefe
| 67946 ||  || — || November 29, 2000 || Socorro || LINEAR || — || align=right | 1.8 km || 
|-id=947 bgcolor=#E9E9E9
| 67947 ||  || — || November 29, 2000 || Socorro || LINEAR || EUN || align=right | 2.5 km || 
|-id=948 bgcolor=#fefefe
| 67948 ||  || — || November 30, 2000 || Socorro || LINEAR || V || align=right | 1.9 km || 
|-id=949 bgcolor=#fefefe
| 67949 ||  || — || November 20, 2000 || Anderson Mesa || LONEOS || — || align=right | 1.4 km || 
|-id=950 bgcolor=#fefefe
| 67950 ||  || — || November 20, 2000 || Anderson Mesa || LONEOS || — || align=right | 1.5 km || 
|-id=951 bgcolor=#fefefe
| 67951 ||  || — || November 20, 2000 || Anderson Mesa || LONEOS || — || align=right | 1.5 km || 
|-id=952 bgcolor=#E9E9E9
| 67952 ||  || — || November 24, 2000 || Anderson Mesa || LONEOS || — || align=right | 5.4 km || 
|-id=953 bgcolor=#fefefe
| 67953 ||  || — || November 24, 2000 || Anderson Mesa || LONEOS || — || align=right | 1.5 km || 
|-id=954 bgcolor=#fefefe
| 67954 ||  || — || November 24, 2000 || Anderson Mesa || LONEOS || FLO || align=right | 2.2 km || 
|-id=955 bgcolor=#fefefe
| 67955 ||  || — || November 24, 2000 || Anderson Mesa || LONEOS || — || align=right | 2.0 km || 
|-id=956 bgcolor=#E9E9E9
| 67956 ||  || — || November 24, 2000 || Anderson Mesa || LONEOS || — || align=right | 5.1 km || 
|-id=957 bgcolor=#fefefe
| 67957 ||  || — || November 25, 2000 || Anderson Mesa || LONEOS || NYS || align=right | 2.3 km || 
|-id=958 bgcolor=#fefefe
| 67958 ||  || — || November 24, 2000 || Anderson Mesa || LONEOS || — || align=right | 1.4 km || 
|-id=959 bgcolor=#E9E9E9
| 67959 ||  || — || November 24, 2000 || Anderson Mesa || LONEOS || EUN || align=right | 3.5 km || 
|-id=960 bgcolor=#fefefe
| 67960 ||  || — || November 25, 2000 || Anderson Mesa || LONEOS || MAS || align=right | 2.0 km || 
|-id=961 bgcolor=#E9E9E9
| 67961 ||  || — || November 25, 2000 || Socorro || LINEAR || — || align=right | 3.5 km || 
|-id=962 bgcolor=#E9E9E9
| 67962 ||  || — || November 26, 2000 || Socorro || LINEAR || EUN || align=right | 3.3 km || 
|-id=963 bgcolor=#fefefe
| 67963 ||  || — || November 27, 2000 || Socorro || LINEAR || FLO || align=right | 1.3 km || 
|-id=964 bgcolor=#E9E9E9
| 67964 ||  || — || November 28, 2000 || Kitt Peak || Spacewatch || EUN || align=right | 3.2 km || 
|-id=965 bgcolor=#d6d6d6
| 67965 ||  || — || November 25, 2000 || Socorro || LINEAR || — || align=right | 8.3 km || 
|-id=966 bgcolor=#fefefe
| 67966 ||  || — || November 30, 2000 || Anderson Mesa || LONEOS || FLO || align=right | 1.3 km || 
|-id=967 bgcolor=#fefefe
| 67967 ||  || — || November 16, 2000 || Anderson Mesa || LONEOS || — || align=right | 1.7 km || 
|-id=968 bgcolor=#E9E9E9
| 67968 ||  || — || November 18, 2000 || Anderson Mesa || LONEOS || — || align=right | 3.6 km || 
|-id=969 bgcolor=#fefefe
| 67969 ||  || — || November 19, 2000 || Anderson Mesa || LONEOS || V || align=right | 2.5 km || 
|-id=970 bgcolor=#fefefe
| 67970 ||  || — || November 22, 2000 || Haleakala || NEAT || V || align=right | 1.3 km || 
|-id=971 bgcolor=#fefefe
| 67971 ||  || — || December 3, 2000 || Kitt Peak || Spacewatch || MAS || align=right | 2.1 km || 
|-id=972 bgcolor=#fefefe
| 67972 ||  || — || December 1, 2000 || Socorro || LINEAR || — || align=right | 1.8 km || 
|-id=973 bgcolor=#fefefe
| 67973 ||  || — || December 1, 2000 || Socorro || LINEAR || V || align=right | 1.4 km || 
|-id=974 bgcolor=#fefefe
| 67974 ||  || — || December 1, 2000 || Socorro || LINEAR || — || align=right | 3.1 km || 
|-id=975 bgcolor=#fefefe
| 67975 ||  || — || December 1, 2000 || Socorro || LINEAR || — || align=right | 3.0 km || 
|-id=976 bgcolor=#E9E9E9
| 67976 ||  || — || December 1, 2000 || Socorro || LINEAR || — || align=right | 5.5 km || 
|-id=977 bgcolor=#fefefe
| 67977 ||  || — || December 1, 2000 || Socorro || LINEAR || — || align=right | 3.7 km || 
|-id=978 bgcolor=#fefefe
| 67978 ||  || — || December 1, 2000 || Socorro || LINEAR || — || align=right | 2.9 km || 
|-id=979 bgcolor=#d6d6d6
| 67979 Michelory ||  ||  || December 4, 2000 || Le Creusot || J.-C. Merlin || — || align=right | 7.6 km || 
|-id=980 bgcolor=#fefefe
| 67980 ||  || — || December 4, 2000 || Bisei SG Center || BATTeRS || V || align=right | 2.3 km || 
|-id=981 bgcolor=#fefefe
| 67981 ||  || — || December 4, 2000 || Socorro || LINEAR || FLO || align=right | 2.6 km || 
|-id=982 bgcolor=#fefefe
| 67982 ||  || — || December 1, 2000 || Socorro || LINEAR || — || align=right | 2.7 km || 
|-id=983 bgcolor=#fefefe
| 67983 ||  || — || December 1, 2000 || Socorro || LINEAR || — || align=right | 1.4 km || 
|-id=984 bgcolor=#fefefe
| 67984 ||  || — || December 1, 2000 || Socorro || LINEAR || V || align=right | 1.8 km || 
|-id=985 bgcolor=#fefefe
| 67985 ||  || — || December 1, 2000 || Socorro || LINEAR || — || align=right | 3.1 km || 
|-id=986 bgcolor=#fefefe
| 67986 ||  || — || December 1, 2000 || Socorro || LINEAR || FLO || align=right | 2.0 km || 
|-id=987 bgcolor=#fefefe
| 67987 ||  || — || December 4, 2000 || Socorro || LINEAR || — || align=right | 2.7 km || 
|-id=988 bgcolor=#fefefe
| 67988 ||  || — || December 4, 2000 || Socorro || LINEAR || — || align=right | 2.1 km || 
|-id=989 bgcolor=#E9E9E9
| 67989 ||  || — || December 4, 2000 || Socorro || LINEAR || — || align=right | 4.0 km || 
|-id=990 bgcolor=#fefefe
| 67990 ||  || — || December 4, 2000 || Socorro || LINEAR || — || align=right | 2.3 km || 
|-id=991 bgcolor=#fefefe
| 67991 ||  || — || December 4, 2000 || Socorro || LINEAR || V || align=right | 1.5 km || 
|-id=992 bgcolor=#E9E9E9
| 67992 ||  || — || December 4, 2000 || Socorro || LINEAR || MAR || align=right | 3.7 km || 
|-id=993 bgcolor=#fefefe
| 67993 ||  || — || December 4, 2000 || Socorro || LINEAR || — || align=right | 2.7 km || 
|-id=994 bgcolor=#E9E9E9
| 67994 ||  || — || December 4, 2000 || Socorro || LINEAR || ADE || align=right | 8.6 km || 
|-id=995 bgcolor=#fefefe
| 67995 ||  || — || December 4, 2000 || Socorro || LINEAR || V || align=right | 1.7 km || 
|-id=996 bgcolor=#fefefe
| 67996 ||  || — || December 4, 2000 || Socorro || LINEAR || — || align=right | 2.9 km || 
|-id=997 bgcolor=#d6d6d6
| 67997 ||  || — || December 4, 2000 || Socorro || LINEAR || — || align=right | 11 km || 
|-id=998 bgcolor=#fefefe
| 67998 ||  || — || December 4, 2000 || Socorro || LINEAR || V || align=right | 1.5 km || 
|-id=999 bgcolor=#E9E9E9
| 67999 ||  || — || December 4, 2000 || Socorro || LINEAR || — || align=right | 5.4 km || 
|-id=000 bgcolor=#fefefe
| 68000 ||  || — || December 4, 2000 || Socorro || LINEAR || FLO || align=right | 1.5 km || 
|}

References

External links 
 Discovery Circumstances: Numbered Minor Planets (65001)–(70000) (IAU Minor Planet Center)

0067